= Battle of Samos =

1824 naval battle of the Greek War of Independence

- Part of the Greek War of Independence
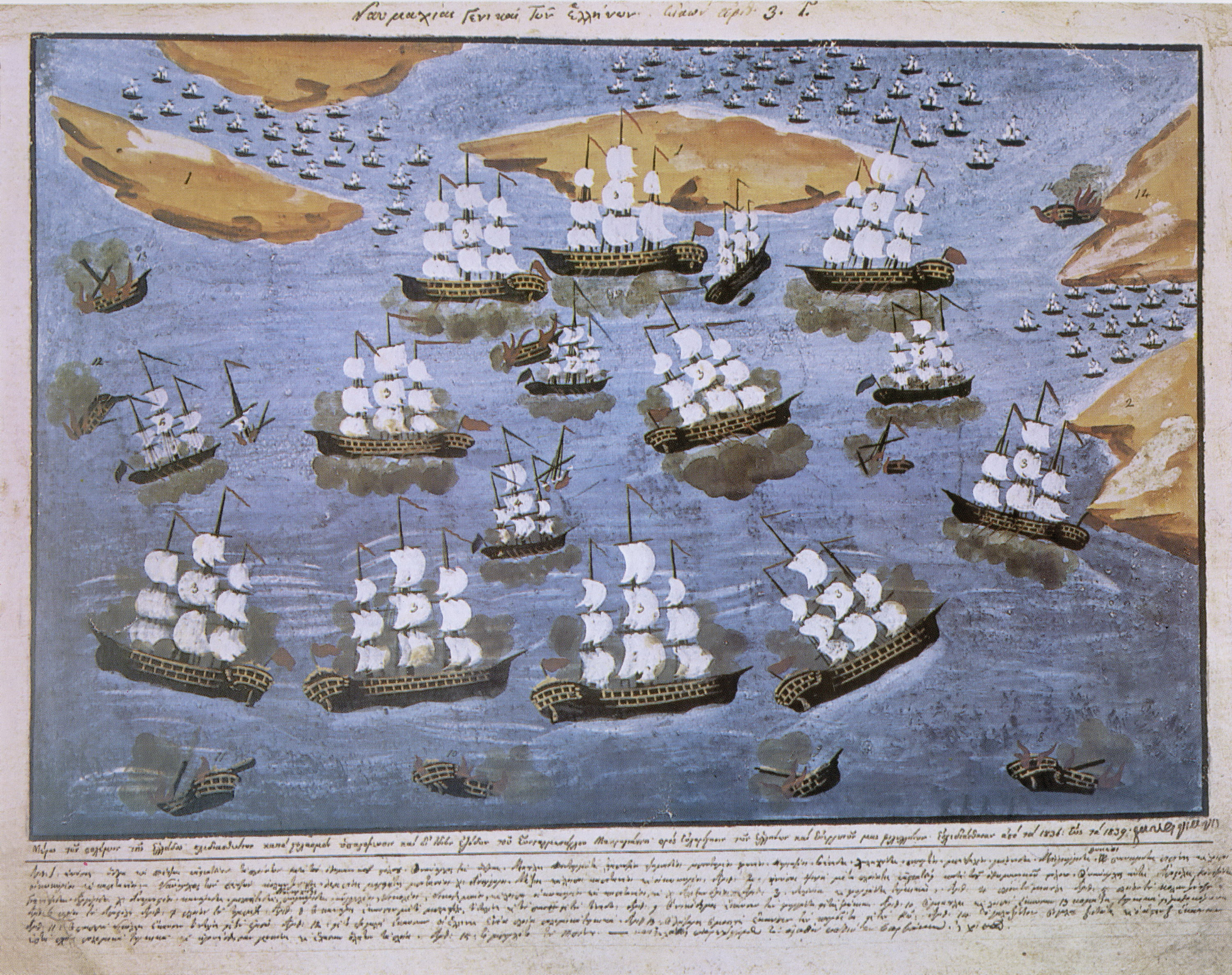
- Artwork by Zografos and Makriyannis
Date	5 August 1824 (Julian calendar)
Location	Off Samos, Aegean Sea
Result	Greek victory

Belligerents
(Greece) First Hellenic Republic	Ottoman Empire

Commanders and leaders
Georgios Sachtouris; Konstantinos Kanaris	Koca Hüsrev Mehmed Pasha

Casualties and losses
6 fireships spent 3 dead	3 ships and 100 guns destroyed 1,000 killed

The Battle of Samos (Greek: Ναυμαχία της Σάμου) was a naval battle fought on August 5–17, 1824 off the Greek island of Samos during the Greek War of Independence.

== Background ==
The island of Samos, under its leader, Lykourgos Logothetis, had successfully rebelled against the Ottomans in 1821, and established its own autonomous government. The island's position, however, a few miles off the Anatolian coast, made it vulnerable to a potential Ottoman attack. In the summer of 1824, following the destruction of Psara, the Ottoman fleet and troops assembled on the Anatolian coast, with the intention of capturing the island. Anxious to avoid repeating the failure to protect Psara, the Greek fleet, under Admiral Georgios Sachtouris, assembled to guard the island. After some minor engagements on the previous days, the decisive battle occurred on August 17.

== Battle ==
The Ottomans attempted to drive the Greek forces from their position in the straits, an Ottoman frigate began the cannonade, while the Ottoman fleet attempted to pass between the Anatolian coast and the Greek fleet's left-wing. At ten o'clock in the morning, the Greek fireships, including one under the celebrated Konstantinos Kanaris, began their approach towards an Ottoman frigate, the first fireship attempting to assail her was thwarted, despite this the fireship of Kanaris launched its own attack, the Ottoman ship attempted to avoid it to no avail. As the fireship reached the Ottoman frigate, the Ottoman crew abandoned ship, jumping into the sea, the flames reached the magazine of the ship causing it to explode, the explosion also caused much debris which destroyed and damaged other ships in the proximity, as well as causing casualties to men on shore. After witnessing the destruction of their frigate the Ottomans suspended any further actions for a short while. The Ottomans would renew their assault and through the course of the battle the Greeks would destroy two more Ottoman vessels, a Tunisian brig of war, and Tripolitanian Corvette. The Ottomans suffered fatal losses totaling three fine ships, 100 cannons, and at least 1,000 men lost. Greek casualties amounted to three dead and six spent fireships. The Ottoman troops encamped on shore who witnessed the battle saw desertions and a decline in moral.

== Aftermath ==
Together with the victory at the strait of Gerontas soon after, the battle of Samos ensured the safety of the island at that time. However, it was not included in independent Greece; rather, it became an autonomous principality under Ottoman suzerainty until the Balkan Wars.
