= Psara (disambiguation) =

Psara is a Greek island in the Aegean sea.

Psara or PSARA may also refer to:

- Psara (town), the only village on the Greek island of Psara
- Greek ship Psara, the name of several Hellenic Navy vessels
- Psara (moth), a genus of moths of the family Crambidae
- Puget Sound Advocates for Retirement Action, an American political organization

== See also ==
- Psyra (disambiguation)
