= Georgios Filippopoulos =

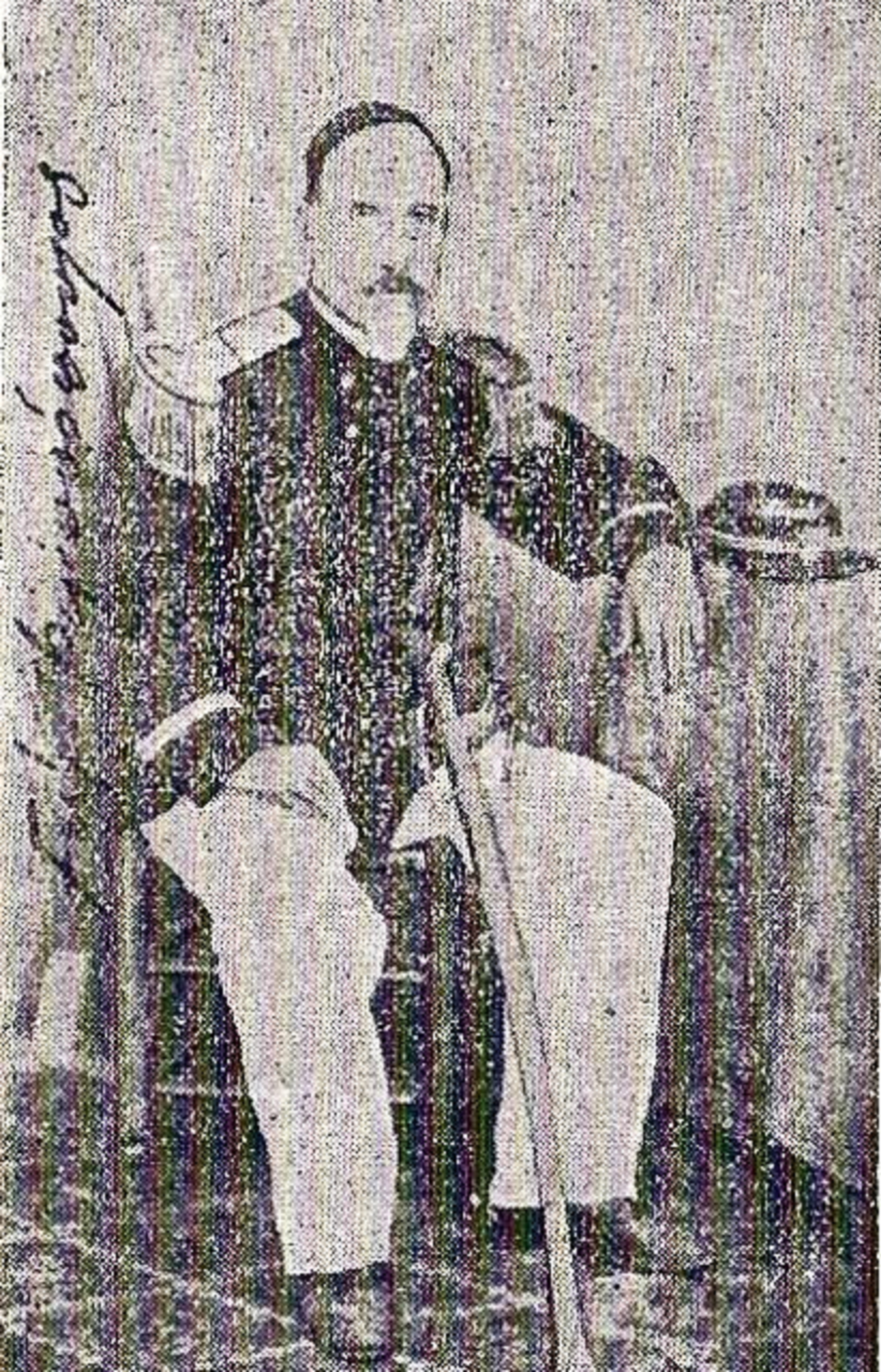
- A photograph of Filippopoulos
- Native name: Γεώργιος Φιλιππόπουλος
- Born: c. 1790s Fourka, Salonica Eyalet, Ottoman Empire (now Greece)
- Allegiance: First Hellenic Republic; Kingdom of Greece
- Branch: Hellenic Army
- Service years: 1821-1845
- Rank: Sergeant
- Conflicts: Greek War of Independence (POW); Destruction of Psara

Georgios Filippopoulos or Filippou or Parathyras (Greek: Γεώργιος Φιλιππόπουλο/Φιλίππου/Παραθυράς) was a Greek revolutionary of the Greek War of Independence.

== Biography ==
He was born in the 1790s in Fourka, Kassandra peninsula, in Chalkidiki. With the start of the Greek War of Independence, he was recruited into local groups of Chalkidiki. After the failure of the revolution in Northern Greece, he continued the struggle in Southern Greece. In 1824 he went to Psara as a member of the island's garrison until the Destruction of Psara by the Ottomans. After being rescued from Psara, he went to southern Greece, where in 1825 he served in the armed group of Manolis Olympios under the overall command of Hatzichristos. He was captured after a battle by the Ottomans and imprisoned for a long time. After his release, he returned to the free Kingdom of Greece and enlisted in the Border Guard.

He retired in 1845 with the rank of Sergeant, and settled in Nafpaktia.
