= Greek ship Sachtouris =

At least three ships of the Hellenic Navy have borne the name Sachtouris (Greek: Σαχτούρης) after the Greek naval hero Georgios Sachtouris:

- Greek gunboat Sachtouris, a gunboat built in 1834.
- Greek corvette Sachtouris, a Flower-class corvette launched in 1940 as HMS Peony and transferred to Greece and renamed in 1943. She was scrapped in 1952.
- Greek destroyer Sachtouris (D214), a Gearing-class destroyer launched in 1945 as USS Arnold J. Isbell she was transferred to Greece in 1974 and renamed. She was scrapped in 2002.
