= Eastern Sporades =

The Eastern Sporades Τμήμα Ανατολικών Σποράδων
- Former subdivision of Greece (1828–1830)
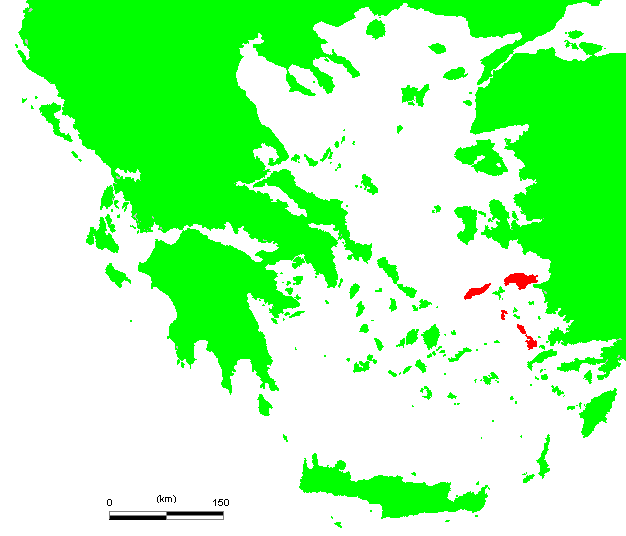
- The Eastern Sporades
- Nickname: The Eastern Islands
- Country: Hellenic State
- Founded on: 13 April 1828
- Founder: Greek government
- Capital: Vathy, Samos

Government
  - Extraordinary commissioner: Ioannis Kolettis (Karmanioloi)
- Time zone: UTC+2 (EET)
  - Summer (DST): UTC+3 (EEST)

Eastern Sporades (Greek: Ανατολικές Σποράδες) or Eastern Islands (Greek: Ανατολικοί Νήσοι) was the name of one of the thirteen divisions (administrative districts) created in 1828 with the administrative division of the newly formed Hellenic State by the government of Ioannis Kapodistrias.

== Etymology ==
"Eastern Sporades" means "those scattered at the east" (compare with "sporadic"). From Classical Antiquity the name "Sporades" has referred to the Aegean island groups outside the central archipelago of the Cyclades.

== History ==
The Eastern Sporades were created by the 10th resolution of the Kapodistrian Greek government on 13 April 1828, which was repealed two years later, in June 1830, when the Greek government was forced to withdraw from Samos and the other islands in the region, as these islands returned to sovereignty of the Sublime Porte, as they were not included in the London Protocol of 1830 which described the territories that would remain independent of the Ottoman Empire.

This division included the islands of Kalymnos, Leros, Patmos, Icaria and Samos, where Ioannis Kolettis was appointed as the extraordinary commissioner of the Eastern Sporades and had his seat on Samos from July 1828. The leader of the military body was a Samian chieftain, Konstantis Lachanas, who had been already appointed as General Captain of the Greek Army in Samos by the General Assembly of the Samians in 1824.

After the departure of the Greek authorities from Samos, in June 1830, Ioannis Kolettis also left the island. Then Lykourgos Logothetis returned to Samos and a Samian State was formed, until 1834. Konstantis Lachanas continued to be the military leader of Military-Political System of Samos, this time appointed by Lykourgos Logothetis.

In 1834, became an autonomous tributary state of the Ottoman Empire as Principality of Samos, until 1912, were the islands captured by Italian forces in Turkish-Italian War. In November 1912, after a delay due to the Balkan Wars, Icaria officially became part of the Kingdom of Greece, Samos followed in March 1913.

During World War II, the two islands was reoccupied by the Italians from May 1941 until the Italian surrender in September 1943. Next month, the Nazi forces start a new occupation until 4 October 1944, when the islands was liberated by the Greek Sacred Band. In 1947, after the Peace Treaty with Italy, rejoined with Greece as part of Dodecanese and the other three main islands of the Eastern Sporades, Kalymnos, Leros and Patmos.

== Geography ==
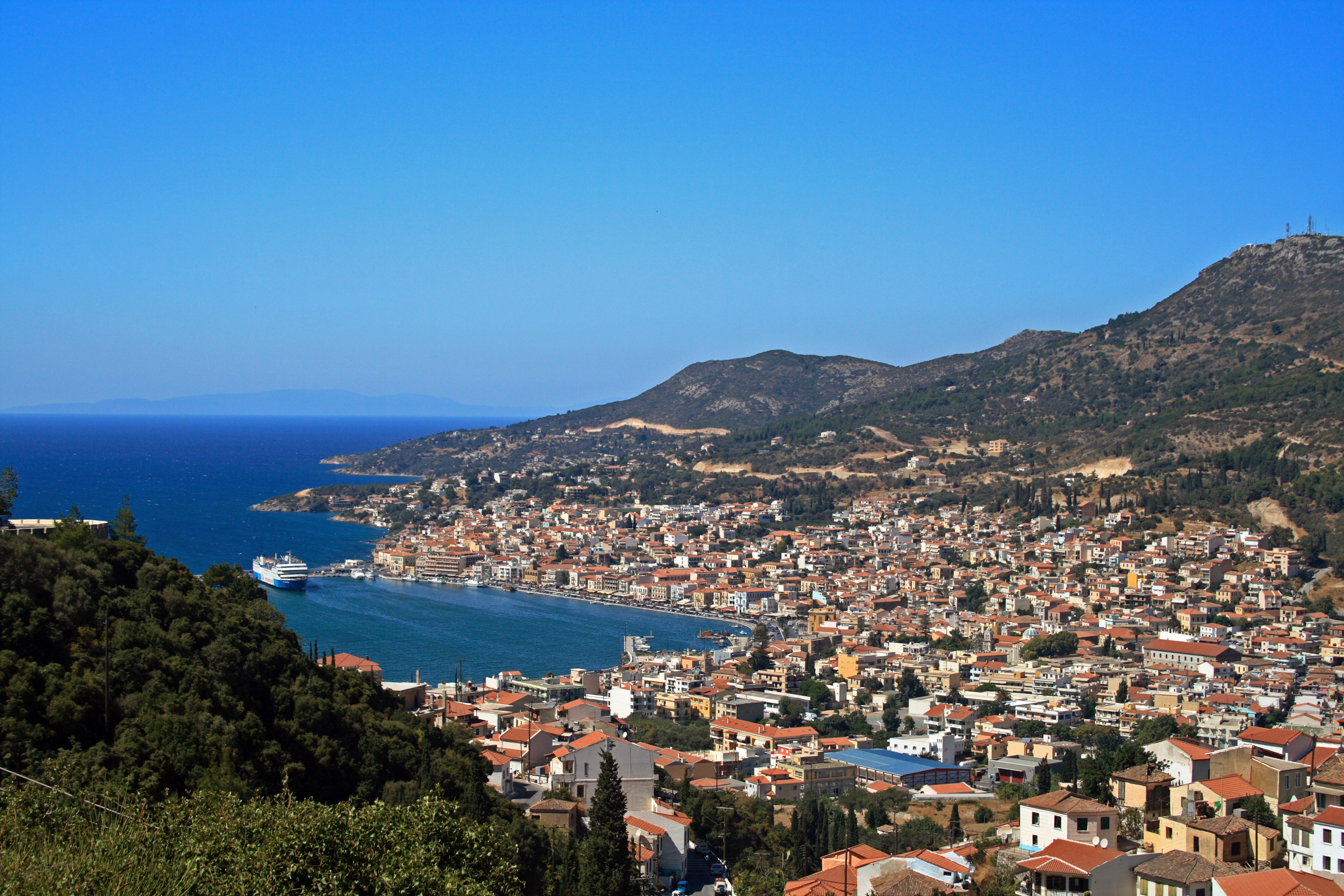
Vathy of Samos

In modern geographical parlance of Greece, there are different Sporades groups. Eastern Sporades are the islands of the eastern and northeastern Aegean, near the coast of Asia Minor. Today, this island group include:

- Samos
- Icaria
- Chios
- Lesbos
- Oinousses
- Psara
- Tenedos
- and smaller island groups

The traditional Eastern Sporades' islands Kalymnos, Leros and Patmos, today, belong to the administrative division of the Dodecanese.
