= Battle of Andros (1825) =

1825 naval battle of the Greek War of Independence

- Part of the Greek War of Independence
Date	1st June
Location	off Andros, Ottoman Empire 37°50′11″N 24°53′53″E
Result	Greek victory

Belligerents
(Greece) First Hellenic Republic	Ottoman Empire

Commanders and leaders
Georgios Sachtouris	Koca Hüsrev Mehmed Pasha

Strength
20 warships 8 fireships	51 warships

Casualties and losses
3 fireships expended, 3 bruloteers dead and 4 wounded in the attack of the flagship	Ottoman flagship destroyed 1 frigate destroyed 1 corvette destroyed More than 550 killed
- Greeks capture 5 Austrian merchant vessels

The Battle of Andros took place on 1 June (20 May O.S.) 1825 at Andros between the fleets of the Ottoman Empire and Revolutionary Greece. The Greek fleet, under Georgios Sachtouris, comprising 20 warships and eight fireships, defeated the Ottoman fleet of 51 vessels by attacking and burning with two fireships the Ottoman flagship—a 66-gun double-banked frigate—and another 34-gun frigate with another fireship.

The Ottoman fleet dispersed, allowing the Greeks to capture a sloop with its crew, as well as five Austrian cargo ships destined to support the Ottoman Siege of Missolonghi.
