= Greek submarine Papanikolis =

Three ships of the Hellenic Navy have borne the name Papanikolis (Παπανικολής), after the naval hero of the Greek War of Independence, Dimitrios Papanikolis:

- Greek submarine Papanikolis (Y-2), a French-built boat, in service 1927–1945
- Greek submarine Papanikolis (S-114), an ex-US GUPPY-IIA boat, in service 1972–1993
- Greek submarine Papanikolis (S-120), the first boat of the Type 214 submarine class, in service since 2010
