= Psyra =

Psyra may refer to:

- Psyra (island), a Greek island in the Aegean sea, referred to by Homer as Psyra
- Psyra (moth), a genus of moths in the family Geometridae

See also

- Psara (disambiguation)
