= Nikolis Apostolis =

Greek naval commander (1770–1827)

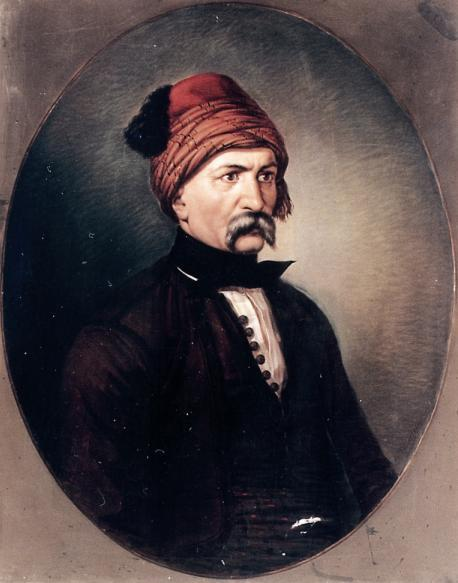
- Portrait by Dionysios Tsokos
- Native name: Νικολής Αποστόλης
- Born: c. 1770; Psara, Eyalet of the Archipelago, Ottoman Empire (now Greece)
- Died: 6 April 1827 Aegina, First Hellenic Republic
- Allegiance: Filiki Etaireia; First Hellenic Republic
- Branch: Hellenic Navy
- Conflicts: Greek War of Independence: Third siege of Missolonghi

Nikolis Apostolis (Greek: Νικολής Αποστόλης, 1770–1827) was a Greek naval commander, leader of the Psarian fleet during the Greek War of Independence.

Apostolis was born on the island of Psara in 1770. He was initiated into the Filiki Eteria in 1818. When the revolt against the Ottoman Empire broke out in 1821, he took part in the naval struggles at the head of the Psarian squadron. Apostolis continued the struggle even after his native Psara was attacked and sacked by the Turks in 1824. He helped supply the army and people of Messolonghi by running through the Ottoman blockade during the final siege of that city.

He died in Aegina on 6 April 1827.
