= Destruction of Psara =

1824 killing of thousands of Greeks

- Part of Massacres during the Greek War of Independence
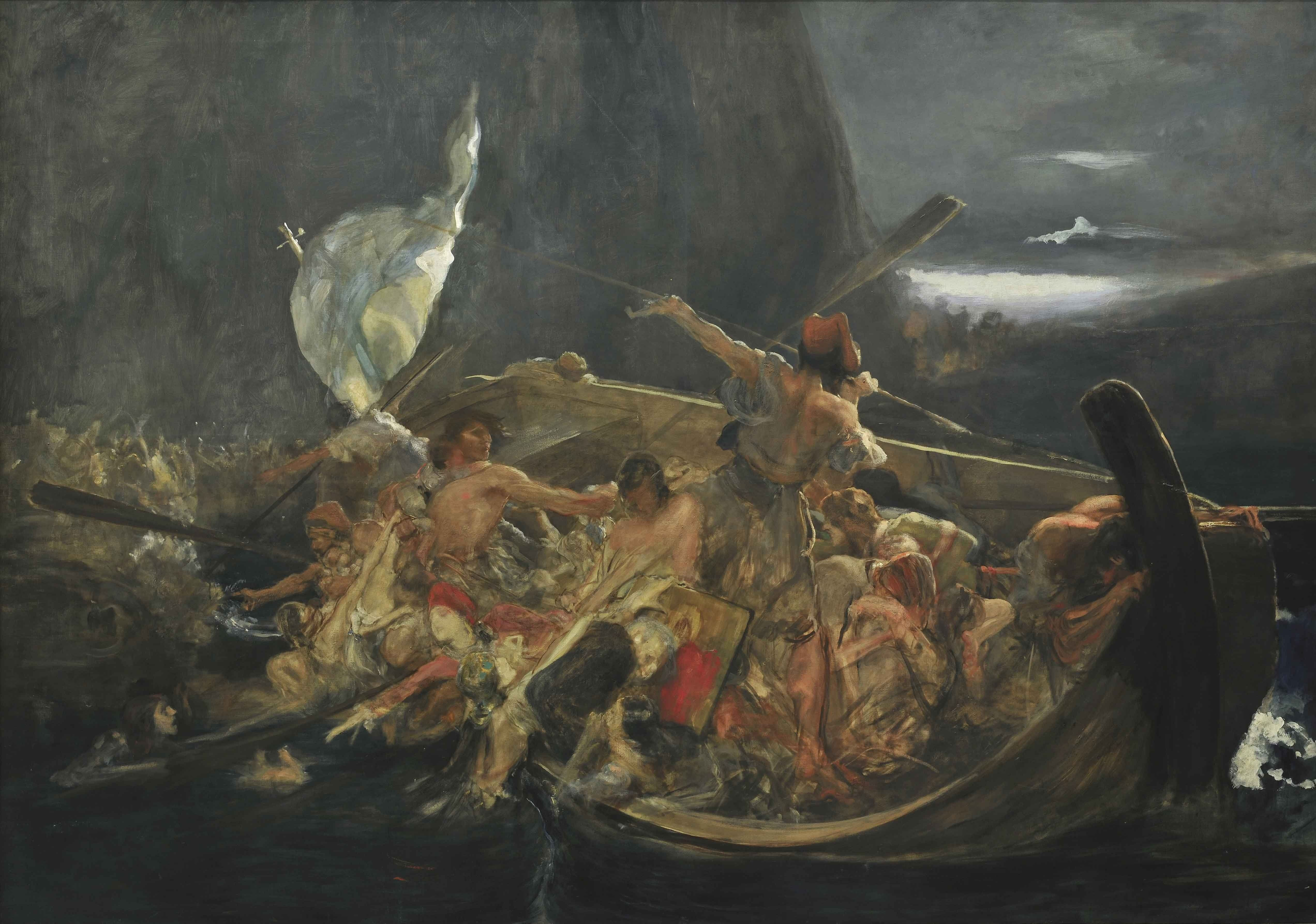
- After the destruction of Psara by Nikolaos Gyzis
- Location: 38°33′N 25°34′E; Psara, Ottoman Empire
- Date: 20–21 June (2–3 July N.S.) 1824
- Deaths: 17,000 killed or sold as slaves
- Perpetrator: Ottoman military

The Destruction of Psara (in Greek: Καταστροφή των Ψαρών, Katastrofí ton Psarón) was the killing of thousands of Greeks on the island of Psara by Ottoman troops during the Greek War of Independence in 1824.

== Background ==
By the beginning of the 19th century, Psara had the third largest trade fleet in Greece after Hydra and Spetses, numbering some 45 ships.

In March 1821, the Greek population revolted against the Ottoman Empire. The inhabitants of Psara joined the struggle on 10 April 1821. Future Prime Minister Konstantinos Kanaris, Dimitrios Papanikolis, Pipinos and Nikolis Apostolis distinguished themselves as naval leaders, using fire ships to combat the more powerful Ottoman Navy.

In April 1822, Turkish forces under the command of Nasuhzade Ali Pasha, Kapudan Pasha of the Ottoman fleet massacred the inhabitants of Chios. 30,000 Greeks were killed and 50,000 were sold as slaves in Smyrna and Constantinople. Psara's native population of 7,500 people was augmented by 23,000 Greek refugees from Chios, but also from Thessaly, Macedonia, Moschonisia and Kydonies.

On the night of 6–7 June 1822, the Greeks responded by destroying the flagship of Nasuhzade Ali Pasha in revenge for the Chios massacre, killing 2,300 Turks, as well as the Kapudan Pasha himself.

== Massacre ==
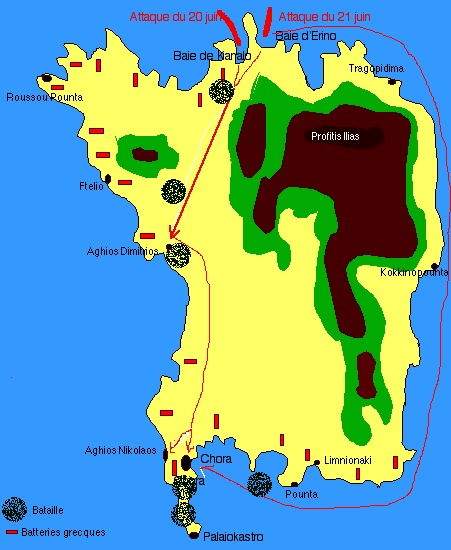
Map of the Ottoman attack on 20 and 21 June 1824. The island measures between 7 and 8 km in its greatest length and width.

The resistance of the Psariots ended the next day with a last stand at the town's old fort of Palaiokastro (alternative name Mavri Rachi, literally "Black Ridge"). Hundreds of soldiers and also women and children had taken refuge there when an Ottoman force of 2,000 stormed the fort. The refugees first threw a white flag with the words "Freedom or Death" (Greek: "Ἐλευθερία ἤ Θάνατος"). Then, the moment the Turks entered the fort, the local Antonios Vratsanos lit a fuse to the gunpowder stock, in an explosion that killed the town's inhabitants along with their enemies — thus remaining faithful to their flag up to their death. A French officer who heard and saw the explosion compared it to a volcanic eruption of Mount Vesuvius.

As a result of the invasion, 17,000 Greeks were killed or sold into slavery. Part of the population managed to flee the island, scattered through what is now Southern Greece. Theophilos Kairis, a priest and scholar, took on many of the orphaned children and developed the famous school the Orphanotropheio of Theophilos Kairis. Psara was deserted and remained in the hands of the Ottomans until it was recaptured by the Greek navy on 21 October 1912 during the First Balkan War. The population of Psara before the massacre was about 7,000. Since the massacre, the population of the island never rose over 1,000 inhabitants.

== Reaction and commemoration ==
The destruction of Psara by the Ottomans was conducted in retaliation for the destruction of Turkish ships by revolutionaries Konstantinos Kanaris and Dimitrios Papanikolis. It inspired poet Andreas Kalvos to write the ode "To Psara" (Greek: "Εἰς Ψαρά").

The event also inspired poet Dionysios Solomos, author of "Hymn to Liberty", to write a poem (or epigram) titled "The Destruction of Psara" (Greek: "Ἡ καταστροφὴ τῶν Ψαρῶν") in 1825:

Στῶν Ψαρῶν τὴν ὁλόμαυρη ράχη
Περπατῶντας ἡ Δόξα μονάχη.
Μελετᾷ τὰ λαμπρὰ παλληκάρια,
Καὶ 'ς τὴν κόμη στεφάνι φορεῖ
Γινομένο ἀπὸ λίγα χορτάρια
Ποῦ εἰχαν μείνῃ 'ς τὴν ἔρημη γῆ.

Διονύσιος Σολωμός
Ἡ καταστροφὴ τῶν Ψαρῶν

On the all-black ridge of Psara
Glory walks by herself taking in
the bright young men on the war field
the crown of her hair wound
from the last few grasses left
on the desolate earth.

Dionysios Solomos
The Destruction of Psara

== Gallery ==
The destruction of Psara inspired Greek painter Nikolaos Gyzis to produce "The Glory of Psara" (Greek: "Η Δόξα των Ψαρών", pastel on paper), "After the destruction of Psara" (Greek: "Μετά την καταστροφή των Ψαρών", oil on canvas) and "The Glory of Psara" ("Η Δόξα των Ψαρών", oil on canvas):

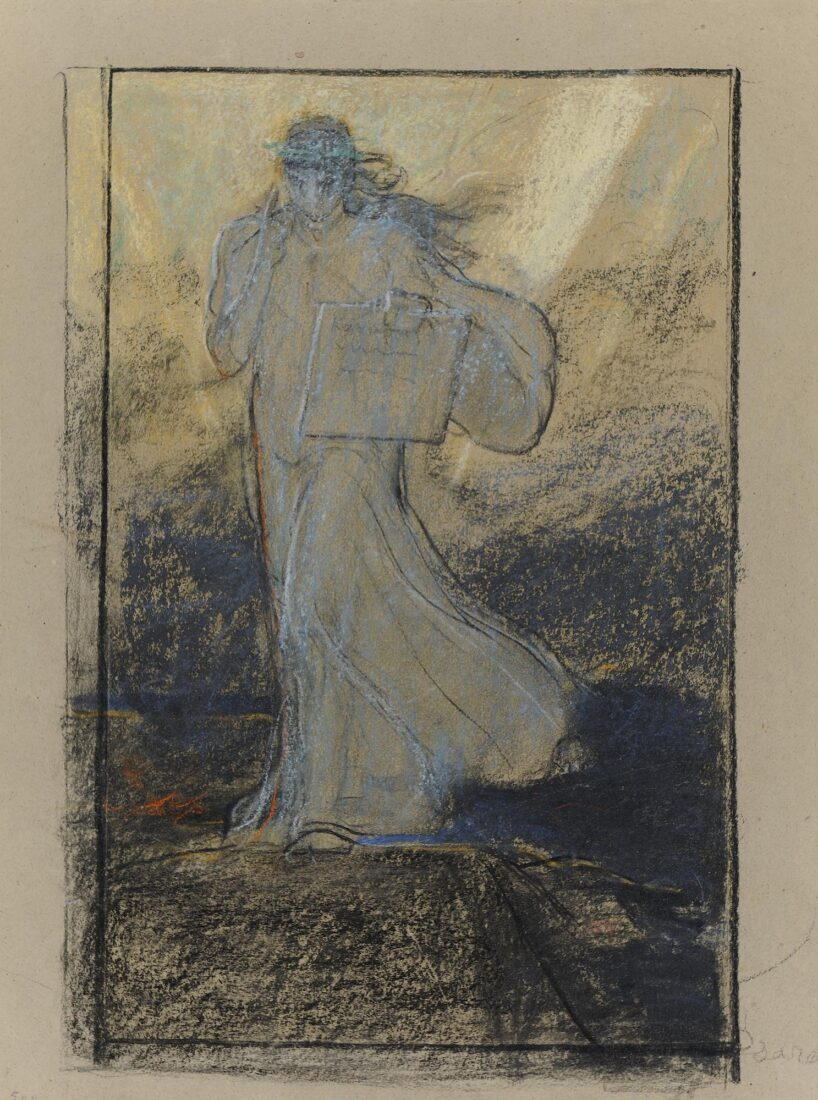
The Glory of Psara, pastel on paper, 1896

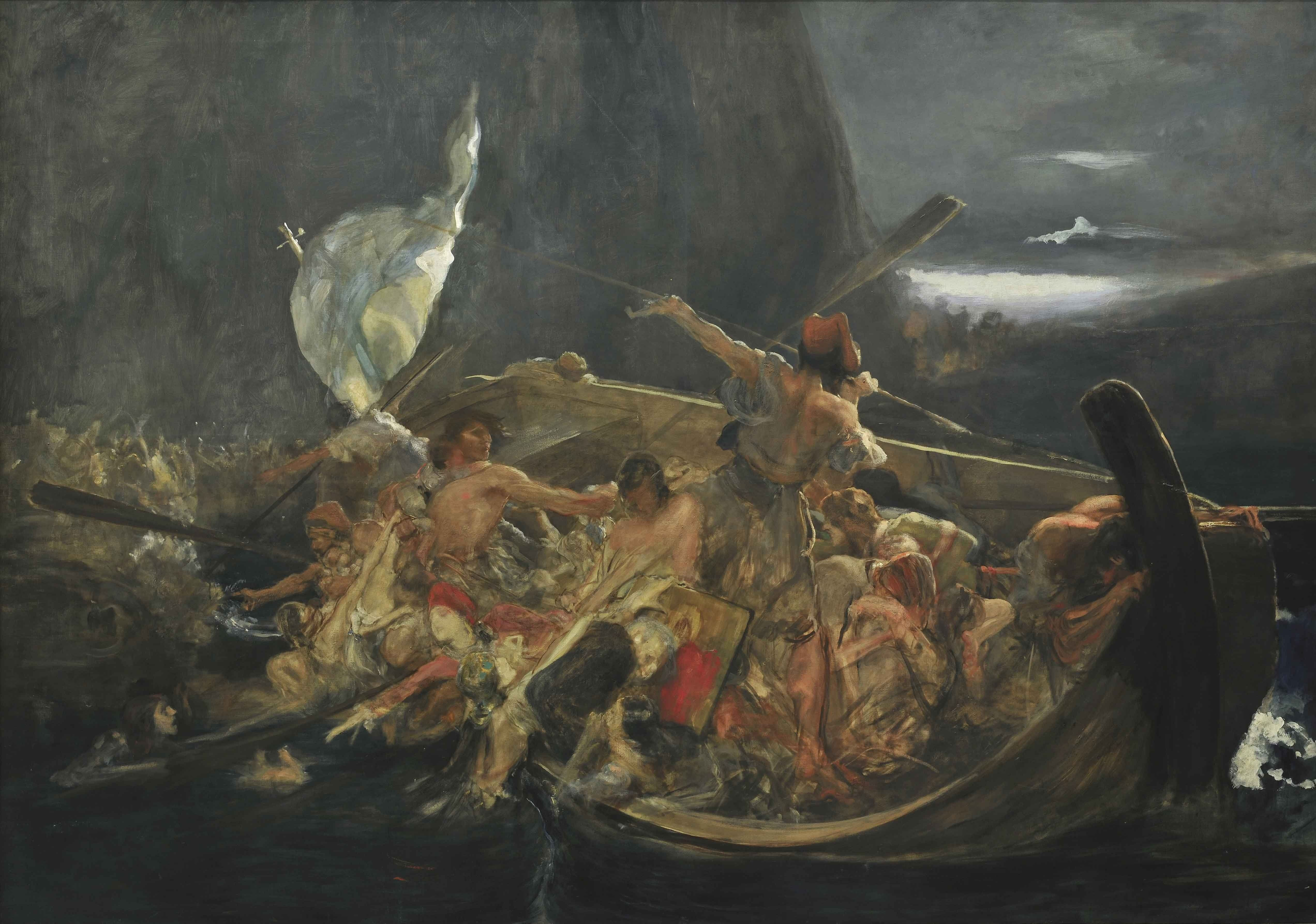
After the destruction of Psara, oil on canvas, 1896-1898

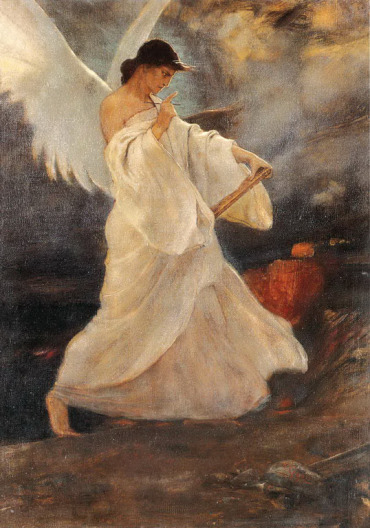
The Glory of Psara, oil on canvas, 1898

== See also ==
- Massacres during the Greek Revolution
- Greek War of Independence
- Chios massacre
- List of massacres in Greece
- Siege of Masada (a similar heroic mass suicide in Jewish history)

== Sources ==
- Comstock, John L. (1828). "Chapter XX: Campaign of 1824 – Loss of Ipsara and barbarities committed there [...]". History of the Greek Revolution compiled from official documents of the greek government. New York: William W. Reed & Co.
- Gordon, Thomas (1832). History of the Greek Revolution. Vol. 2. Cambridge: Cambridge University Press.
- Brunet de Presle, Wladimir; Blanchet, Alexandre (1860). Grèce depuis la conquête romaine jusqu'à nos jours [Greece from the Roman conquest to the present day] (in French). Paris: Firmin Didot.
- Solomos, Dionysios (1901). Ἄπαντα τὰ εὑρισκόμενα (in Greek). Kostis Palamas (prologue). Athens: P. D. Sakellarios. At the Anemi digital library.
- Finlay, George (1971). Tozer, H. F. (ed.). History of the Greek Revolution and the Reign of King Otho. Oxford: Clarendon Press. ISBN 0-900834-12-9.
- Sfyroeras, Vasileios (1975). "Σταθεροποίηση της Επαναστάσεως 1822–1823" [Stabilization of the Revolution 1822–1823]. In Christopoulos, Georgios A. & Bastias, Ioannis K. (eds.). Ιστορία του Ελληνικού Έθνους [History of the Greek Nation] (in Greek). Vol. ΙΒ: Η Ελληνική Επανάσταση (1821 - 1832) [The Greek Revolution (1821 - 1832)]. Athens: Ekdotiki Athinon. ISBN 978-960-213-108-4.
- Xiradaki, Koula (1995). Γυναίκες του 21 [Women of 21] (in Greek). Athens: Dodoni. ISBN 960-248-781-X.
- Clogg, Richard (2002). A Concise History of Greece. Cambridge University Press. ISBN 978-0-521-00479-4.
- Rothenberg, Jerome; Robinson, Jeffrey (2009). Poems for the Millennium. Vol. 3. University of California Press. ISBN 978-0-520-25598-2.
