= Sachtouris =

Sachtouris is a surname. Notable people with the surname include:

- Georgios Sachtouris (1783–1841), Greek ship captain and admiral
- Miltos Sachtouris (1919–2005), Greek poet
