= Puget Sound Advocates for Retirement Action =

American political organization

The Puget Sound Advocates for Retirement Action (PSARA) is an American political organization in the Puget Sound region of the US state of Washington that organizes and advocates for older adults.

== History ==
The Puget Sound Advocates for Retirement Action was founded in 1981 as an organization for retired union members and community activists. In 2001, PSARA affiliated with the Alliance for Retired Americans (ARA). In 2002, the organization changed its name to the Puget Sound Council for Senior Citizens. In 2012, the organization disaffiliated with the ARA and changed its name to Puget Sound Advocates for Retirement Action.

== Activities ==
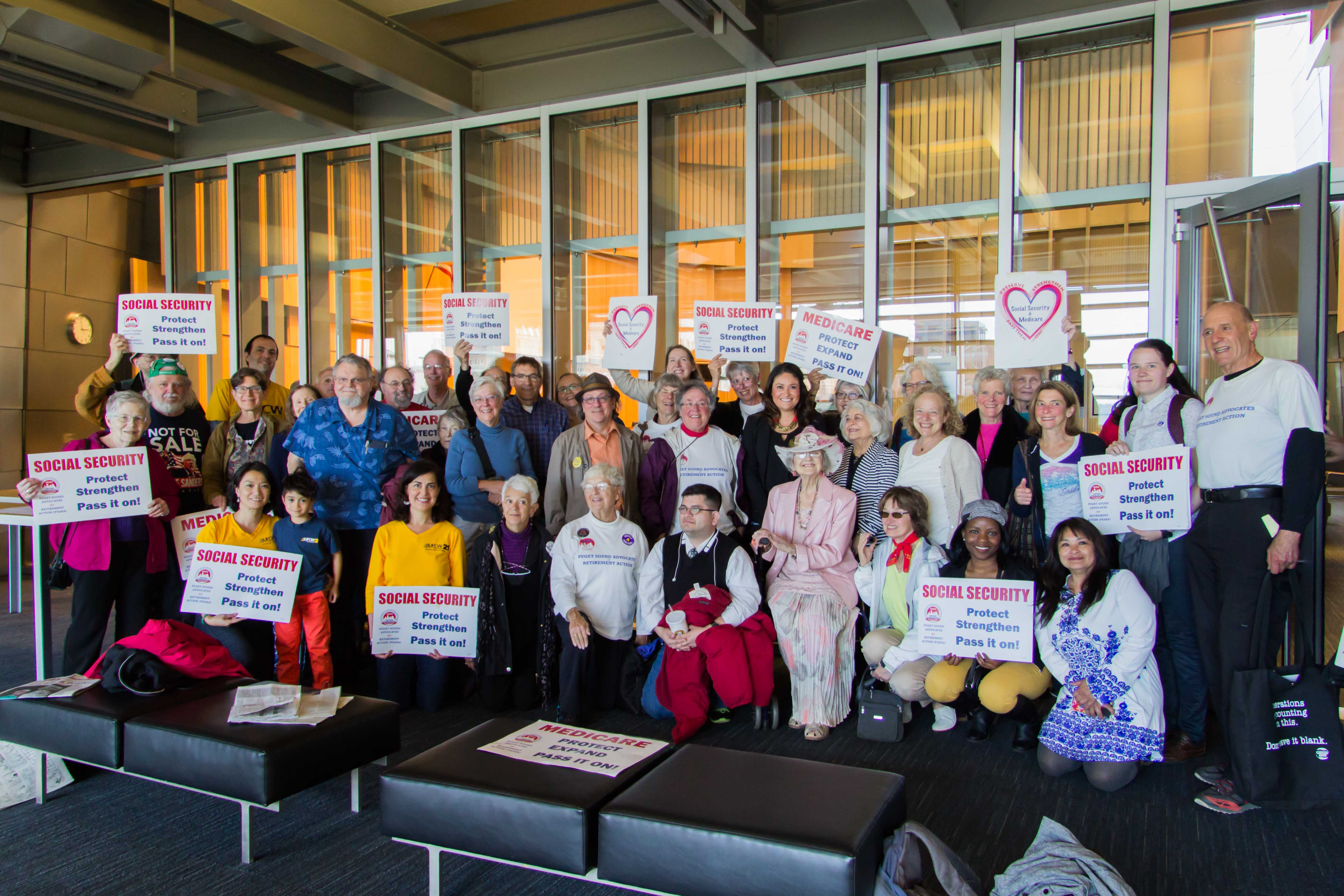
PSARA members lobbying Seattle City Council Member Lorena Gonzalez

PSARA advocates primarily for issues that affect older adults, including affordable healthcare, maintaining Social Security, lowering prescription drug prices, reducing taxes and utility bills, affordable housing, and increased social services. In addition to lobbying, PSARA also engages in educational activities and publishes a monthly newsletter, The Retiree Advocate. PSARA is an auxiliary group of the Washington State Labor Council and regularly partners with Social Security Works and the Washington Fair Trade Coalition. Despite no longer being affiliated with the national organization, PSARA continues to work closely with the Washington state chapter of the ARA.

== Notable Members ==
- Garry Owens, Seattle community organizer and former Black Panther
- Lonnie Nelson, Seattle labor activist
- Jeff Johnson, former president of the Washington State Labor Council
