= Georgios Sachtouris =

Hellenic Navy admiral (1783–1841)

Vice Admiral Georgios Sachtouris
- Γεώργιος Σαχτούρης
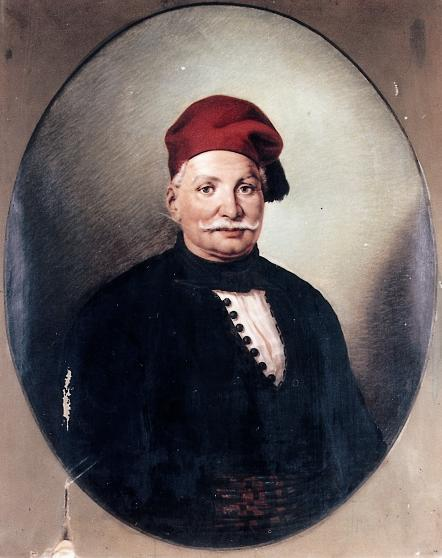
- A portrait of Georgios Sachtouris by Dionysios Tsokos
- Born: 1783; Hydra, Eyalet of the Archipelago, Ottoman Empire (now Greece)
- Died: 1841 (aged 57–58); Hydra, Kingdom of Greece
- Relatives: Miltos Sachtouris (great-grandson)
- Military career
- Allegiance: First Hellenic Republic; Kingdom of Greece
- Branch: Hellenic Navy
- Rank: Vice Admiral
- Conflicts: Greek War of Independence; Siege of Patras; Battle of Nauplia; Battle of Samos; Greek Civil Wars; Battle of Andros; Battle of Gerontas; Raid on Alexandria

Georgios Sachtouris (Greek: Γεώργιος Σαχτούρης, 1783–1841) was a Greek ship captain and a leading admiral of the Greek War of Independence.

Sachtouris was born in Hydra in 1796 to a family of Arvanite origin. Like most of its population he engaged in maritime commerce. Following the outbreak of the Greek War of Independence, he became a leading commander of the Hydriot ships, and participated in the naval battles of Patras, Spetses, Samos, Gerontas, and others, as well as in the failed raid on Alexandria. Governor Ioannis Kapodistrias appointed him commander of the Messenian squadron, but soon he joined the opposition forces against the Governor.

With the establishment of the independent Kingdom of Greece, Sachtouris joined the Royal Hellenic Navy, receiving the rank of vice admiral and serving in several senior commands.

He died at his home island of Hydra in 1841. His sons Dimitrios and Konstantinos likewise became naval officers. His great-grandson Miltos Sachtouris was a distinguished poet.

The Greek navy named a 1834-built gunboat, a World War II-era Flower-class corvette, and a Gearing-class destroyer after him.

Two cannons used on his ship during the revolution are on either side of the stairs outside the National Historical Museum in Athens and one outside the Hellenic Maritime Museum in Piraeus.
