= Jeff Johnson (labor leader) =

American labor leader

- Born: 1951 (age 74–75); Long Island, New York
- Education: Georgetown University, New School for Social Research
- Occupations: President, Washington State Labor Council
- Organization(s): Chair, Board of Labor Network for Sustainability Co-Leader, Puget Sound Advocates for Retirement Action
- Term: 2011-2018
- Predecessor: Rick Bender
- Successor: Larry Brown

Jeffrey Johnson is an American labor leader who was president of the Washington State Labor Council (WSLC) from 2011 to 2018.

== Biography ==
=== Early life and education ===
Jeffrey George Johnson was born and grew up in Oyster Bay, Long Island, New York, in 1951. His mother had grown up in Pittsburgh and was from a family of Croatian heritage. In 1959, his father died of a heart attack while at work. This prompted his mother, who had been out of the workforce for over a decade, to return to work to support to support her children. Johnson credits his middle class upbringing to the collective bargaining agreements achieved by his mother's unions.

Johnson entered the workforce when he was in high school, working at a local cabinet maker's shop. Encouraged by his mother to continue his education, in 1967, Johnson began studying economics at Georgetown University, during which he became active in the Civil Rights and anti-Vietnam War movements. He went on to study political economy as a graduate student at the New School for Social Research in Manhattan.

Johnson's first involvement with labor activism was volunteering with unionized rank and file transit workers. As he became more involved in the labor movement, Johnson became less focused on his PhD dissertation. During this time, Johnson earned money mostly through adjunct teaching gigs for local schools, unions, and community organizations and was a member of the American Federation of Teachers. For three years, he taught economics full-time at the Harry Van Arsdale Center for Labor Studies at Empire State College. Johnson also spent time working for the Center for Transnational Corporations in the United Nations as a second job to earn extra money.

=== Career ===
In the summer of 1986, Johnson and his wife drove across the country and moved to Seattle, motivated by their desire to start a family outside of Brooklyn. The couple settled in Olympia, and Johnson began to search for a job. He landed a job as research director for the Washington State Labor Council after completing a project for then-president Larry Kenney, who Johnson described as "a real character, and a bit of an acerbic." Early in his career, Johnson was introduced to Tomas Villanueva, who he began working with to improve the conditions of farmworkers. Villanueva had been elected president of the newly formed United Farm Workers union in Washington state. At the time, farmworkers were not protected by minimum wage, pesticide control, or child labor laws, and they were ineligible for unemployment insurance or workers' compensation. Johnson and Villanueva worked together over a five year period to establish child labor and health and safety protections specifically for farmworkers, and they also ran minimum wage and workers' compensation initiatives. In addition, they launched a lawsuit to include farmworkers in unemployment insurance programs. In 1992, Johnson and Villanueva worked with Chicano activist and lawyer Guadalupe Gamboa and his uncle, a professor at the University of Washington, to write a collective bargaining bill for farmworkers in Washington, modeled after the California Labor Relations Act.

In 1993, after the election of Mike Lowry as governor of Washington, Larry Kenney stepped down from the president position of the WSLC to accept a position on the Washington State Tax Appeals Board, and Rick Bender was appointed president. Johnson became the WSLC's Lead Lobbyist. In 1998, he spearheaded another minimum wage initiative, creating a broad coalition of community organizations to back the campaign. Johnson was also involved in the WSLC's work around immigration reform and efforts to connect with the Latino community, including by affiliating with CASA Latina.

In 2011, Johnson was elected president of the WSLC after Rick Bender announced that he would not be seeking another term. During his time as president, Johnson was involved in much of the community outreach and coalition building from before. He criticized Boeing for its handling of the 2014 contract negotiations with the International Association of Machinists and for moving jobs from Washington to South Carolina, a right-to-work state. The WSLC, under his leadership, supported the first campaigns to raise the minimum wage to $15 per hour, first in SeaTac then in Seattle. He also promoted efforts to address issues of racism in labor and worked with state legislators on climate justice initiatives. Johnson retired from the WSLC in 2018 after serving two terms. He remains active in Puget Sound Advocates for Retirement Action and other local causes.

== Sources ==
This article incorporates text from a free content work. Licensed under CC0 (license statement/permission). Text taken from Jeffrey Johnson papers, Labor Archives of Washington, Archives West, Orbis-Cascade Alliance.
