= Battle of Gerontas =

1824 naval battle of the Greek War of Independence

- Part of the Greek War of Independence
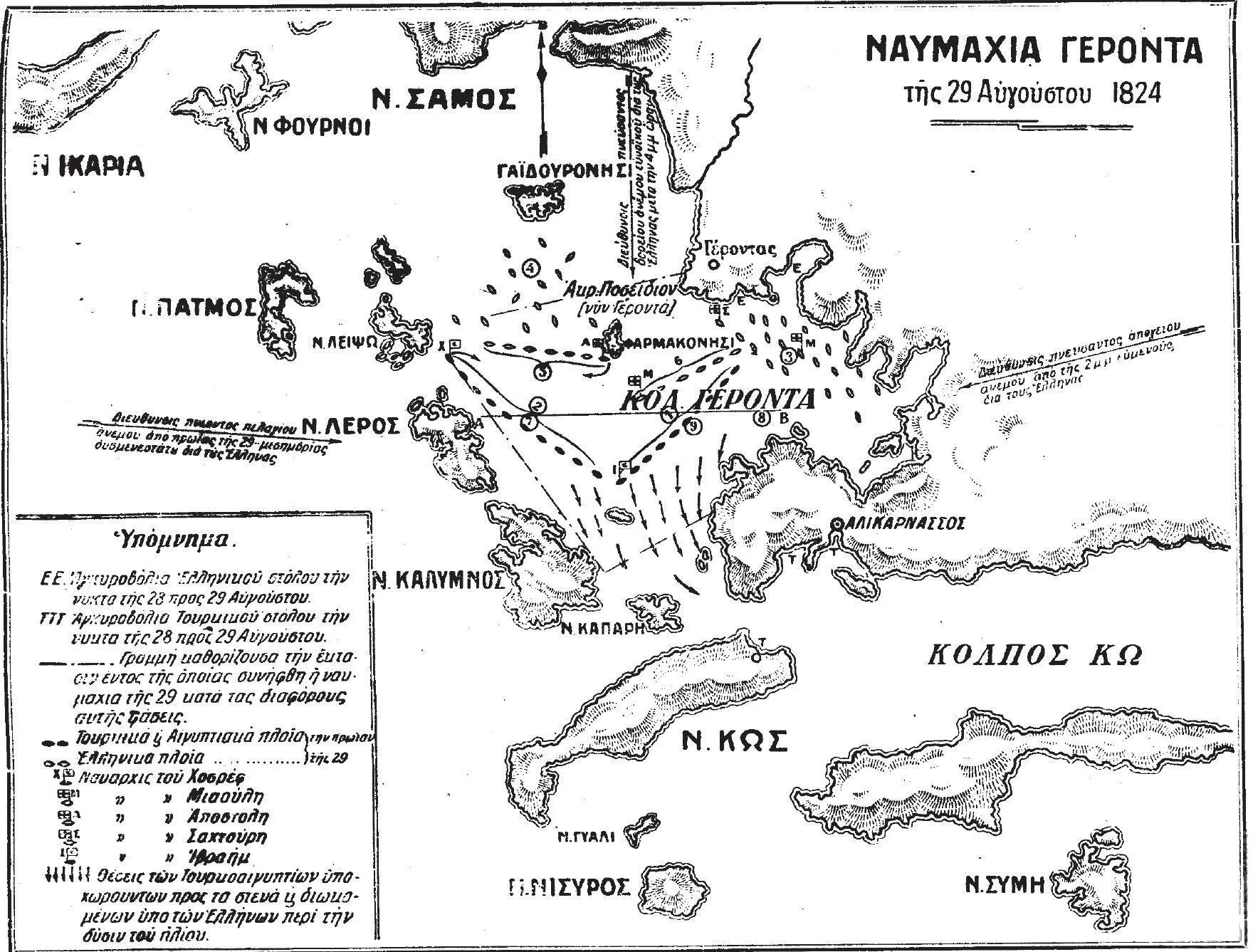
- Plan of the battle
Date	10 September [O.S. 29 August] 1824
Location	off Leros, Aegean Sea 37°12′07″N 27°10′12″E
Result	Greek victory; Control of Samos secured

Belligerents
(Greece) First Hellenic Republic	Ottoman Empire

Commanders and leaders
(Greece) Andreas Miaoulis (Greece) Dimitrios Papanikolis	(Ottoman Empire) Koca Hüsrev Mehmed Pasha

Strength
70–75 warships (of them 9 fireships); 800 cannons	1 battleship 18 frigates 14 corvettes 70 brigs and schooners 30 small craft 151 transports (most probable estimate), not all engaged

Casualties and losses
Unknown	One 44-gun frigate destroyed 1,300 killed Tunisian admiral and one Egyptian colonel captured
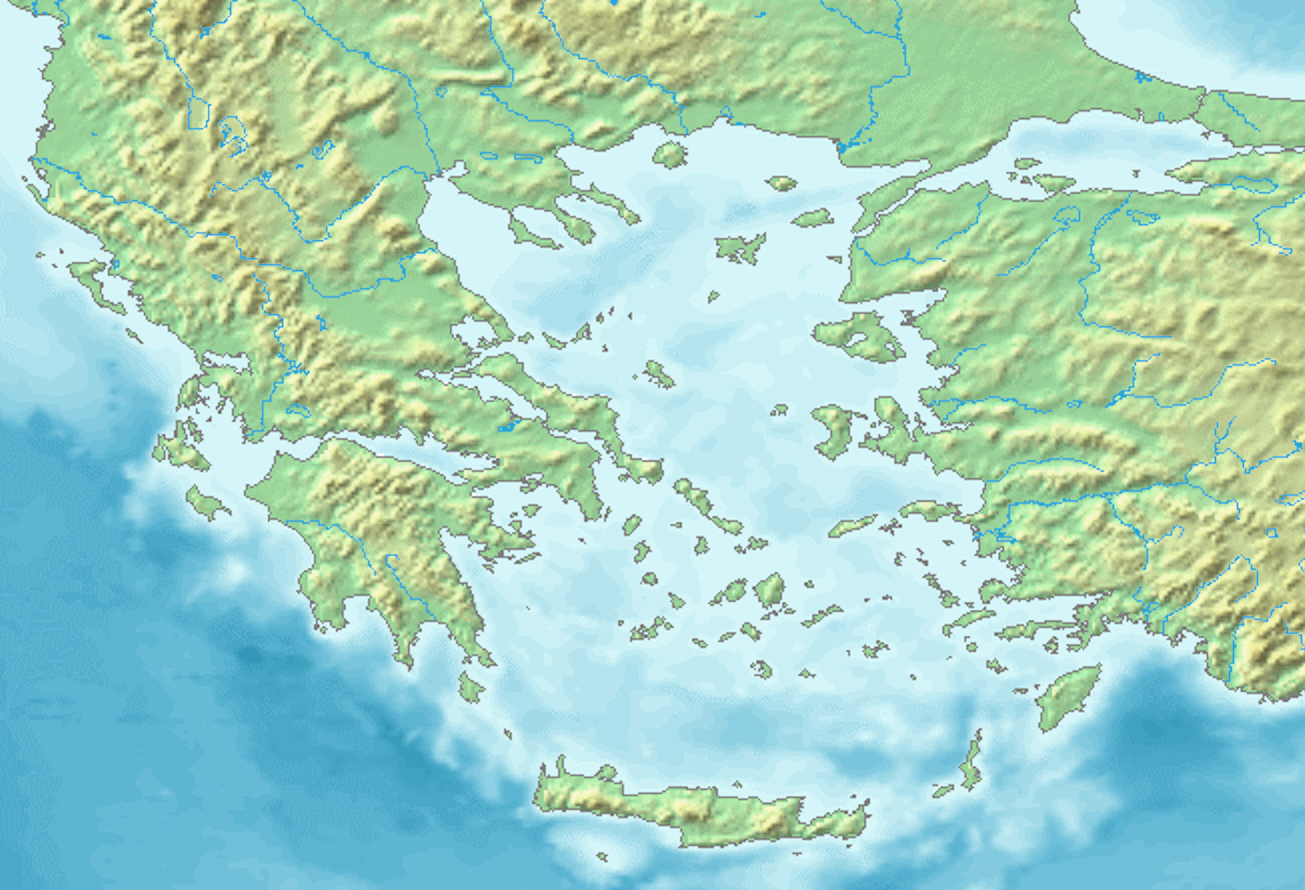
- Location within Aegean Sea Battle of Gerontas (Turkey)

The Battle of Gerontas (Greek: Ναυμαχία του Γέροντα) was a naval battle fought close to the island of Leros in the southeast Aegean Sea. On 10 September [O.S. 29 August] 1824, a Greek fleet of 75 ships defeated an Ottoman armada of 100 ships contributed by Egypt, Tunisia and Tripoli.

The Battle of Gerontas was one of the most decisive naval engagements of the Greek War of Independence and secured the island of Samos under Greek control.

== Background ==
In August 1824, the Ottomans looked to secure the island of Samos off the coast of Asia Minor, a previous attempt launched earlier in the month on 5 August (O.S.) resulted in an Ottoman defeat at the Battle of Samos and caused delay. By 29 August, the Ottoman fleet had grown to some 100 warships and launched an attack on the scattered Greek forces whose fleet made up a force of some 70-75 warships.

== The battle ==
After the battle off Kos island on 24 August 1824, the Greek detachment of 15 ships was anchored in the Gerontas bay, while the rest of the fleet drifted in the open sea because of the lack of a wind. On the morning of 29 August 1824, the 86 warships of the Ottoman and Egyptian flotilla detected the Greek fleet and proceeded with a pincer movement, using advantageous winds. The Greek fleet in the bay had to resort to towing their ships by lifeboats to reach a more advantageous position for fighting.

The wave of Greek fireships disorganized the Ottoman lines sufficiently for all of the Greek ships to escape from Gerontas bay. Later a shift in the wind put the Greek fleet in the advantage, allowing a second attack by their fireships. One of the fireships burned the Tunisian flotilla flagship. Because the Greek fireships selectively targeted the enemy flagships, the Ottoman commanders panicked and ordered their ships to leave the battle lines, leading to confusion and the unorganized retreat of the Ottoman forces.
