= Military-Political System of Samos =

State in the island of Samos (1821–1834)

Military-Political System of Samos Στρατοπολιτικόν Σύστημα Σάμου
- 1821–1834
- Flag of the Samian revolution, with the emblems of the Filiki Etaireia and the initials of the motto "Freedom or Death"
- Status: Regional government in revolt against the Ottoman Empire, part of the Provisional Greek government
- Capital: Vathy
- Common languages: Greek
- Religion: Greek Orthodox
- Government: Republic
- Governor-General
  - April 1821 – April 1828: Lykourgos Logothetis
  - April 1828 – February 1829: Ioannis Kolettis
  - February–October 1829: Dimitrios Christidis
  - October 1829 – July 1830: Ioannis Kolettis
  - July 1830 – 1833: Lykourgos Logothetis
- History
  - Established: May 1821
  - Administrative incorporation into Greece: 1828–1830
  - Disestablished: August 1834
Preceded by	Succeeded by
Eyalet of the Archipelago	Principality of Samos

The Military-Political System of Samos (Greek: Στρατοπολιτικόν Σύστημα Σάμου) was a provisional regime that existed in the island of Samos during the Greek War of Independence.

Samos rose up against Ottoman rule on 18 April 1821, under the leadership of Konstantinos Lachanas. In May 1821, the Samiot leader Lykourgos Logothetis formalized the provisional administrative regime of the island, with the promulgation of the "Military-Political Organization of the Island of Samos" (Στρατοπολιτικός Διοργανισμός της Νήσου Σάμου). This constitutional document organized both the executive-legislative and military administration of the island. At the apex of the system was a Governor-General (Γενικός Διοικητής), assisted by three Political Judges (Πολιτικοί Κριτές) who were elected by a General Assembly of the island, composed of the elected ephors of each village, and the Secretary of the Administration (Γραμματεύς του Διοικητηρίου). There were also a Police President, Harbour Masters and Customs officials. The island's military was organized into four chiliarchies, with the Governor-General as the commander-in-chief. Logothetis appointed four of his closest aides as the first chiliarchs, who appointed subordinate pentakosiarchs, and they in turn appointed subordinate hekatontarchs, etc.

Nevertheless, the Greek provisional government that emerged from the First National Assembly at Epidaurus attempted to abolish the separate Samian institutions with its law on provincial administration 30 April 1822, and impose an appointed governor, Kyriakos Moralis. This led to a short civil war on the island, with the supporters of the local system winning out. With the exception of a short period in 1828–1830, during the governorship of Ioannis Kapodistrias, when Samos was administered as part of the Province of the Eastern Sporades, the island retained its autonomous political system.

Due to its proximity to the Anatolian shore and its distance from the main centres of the Greek Revolution on the Greek mainland, Samos was particularly vulnerable to Ottoman attack. With the crucial assistance of the Greek revolutionary fleet, the Samians were successful in repelling three Ottoman attempts at recapturing the island, in July 1821, August–September 1824 and July–August 1826. The island, however, was not incorporated into the independent Kingdom of Greece. Instead, the island resumed its separate government until it was transformed into an autonomous tributary principality in 1834.
