= Arnold J. Isbell =

United States Navy officer

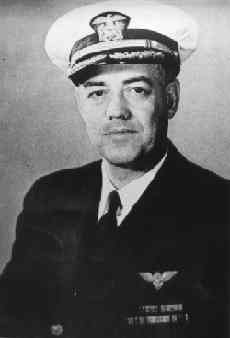
- Captain Arnold J. Isbell
- Born: Arnold Jay Isbell; September 22, 1899; Oto, Iowa
- Died: March 19, 1945 (aged 45) † off Okinawa
- Military career
- Allegiance: United States of America
- Branch: United States Navy
- Service years: 1917–45
- Rank: Captain
- Commands: USS Card; VP-54; VN-2D8; VN-4D8
- Conflicts: World War II
- Awards: Navy Distinguished Service Medal; Air Medal

Captain Arnold J. Isbell, USN (September 22, 1899 – March 19, 1945) was a United States Navy officer and Naval Aviator who was killed near the end of World War II.

== Early life and career ==
Isbell was born September 22, 1899, in Oto, Iowa. Raised in Logan, Iowa, he was appointed to the U.S. Naval Academy, Annapolis, Maryland, in 1917, graduating and being commissioned as an ensign in 1920. He was graduated a year early because of accelerated training received during World War I. He served in various vessels in the Pacific until 1923, at which time he was ordered to duty in flight instruction. He received his wings and appointment as Naval Aviator (Seaplane) on January 11, 1924.

From 1924 to 1926 his duty involved flying in various categories, the most notable being on the Navy's first carrier, USS Langley. From 1926 to 1929 he undertook the postgraduate course in ordnance at Annapolis, Maryland. Isbell's duty from 1929 until 1940 when he was promoted to the rank of commander was principally concerned with flying and ordnance. He served on the original carrier Lexington, placed the carrier Ranger in commission and served on the staff of the Commander Aircraft, attached to the Battle Force. At Naval Air Station Pensacola, Isbell assumed command of Training Squadron VN-4D8 in September 1937 and Training Squadron VN-2D8 in January 1939.

== World War II service ==
Prior to the actual entrance of the United States in World War II, Captain Isbell was actively engaged in operations vitally connected with the expansion of US bases. He was awarded the Air Medal for "meritorious achievement while participating in aerial flight as Commanding Officer of Patrol Squadron 54 during the initial selection and survey of US Army and Navy Bases in Newfoundland in September and October 1940."

Isbell was promoted to captain in 1942 while in command of the Naval Air Station, Sitka, Alaska. In 1943, Isbell took command of the USS Card, an escort carrier, for which duty he was awarded the Navy Distinguished Service Medal for a notable record of German submarine sinkings in the Central Atlantic convoy routes during World War II.

Following his successful command of the Card, Isbell was on duty with the Tenth Fleet, Anti-submarine Warfare, Navy Department, Washington, D.C., for a year. He then reported to the Pacific Fleet for assignment as Commanding Officer of USS Yorktown. It was while taking passage on USS Franklin prior to assuming command that Isbell lost his life when the carrier was hit by bombs from a Japanese plane off Okinawa on March 19, 1945.

== Namesake and honors ==
The destroyer USS Arnold J. Isbell (DD-869) was named in Captain Isbell's honor. In addition, the Captain Arnold Jay Isbell Trophy, a US Navy award to recognize superior air antisubmarine warfare (ASW) squadrons, is also named in his honor.
