= Theophilos Kairis =

Greek priest, philosopher and revolutionary

The Reverend Theophilos Kairis
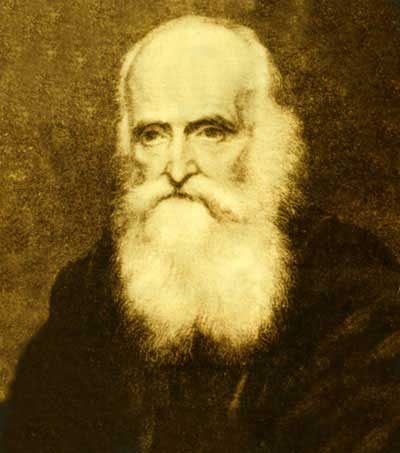
- Theophilos Kairis
- Born: 19 October 1784; Andros, Ottoman Empire
- Died: 13 January 1853 (aged 68); Syros, Kingdom of Greece

Philosophical work
- Era: Age of Enlightenment
- Region: Western philosophy
- School: Modern Greek Enlightenment, liberalism
- Main interests: Natural philosophy, philosophy of religion, deism, separation of church and state, liberal democracy
- Notable ideas: Theosebism

Theophilos Kairis (Greek: Θεόφιλος Καΐρης; baptismal name Θωμᾶς Thomas; 19 October 1784 – 13 January 1853) was a Greek Eastern Orthodox priest, philosopher and revolutionary. He was born in Andros, Cyclades, Ottoman Greece, as a son of a distinguished family.

== Education ==
Kairis studied in the theological school of Smyrna and was ordained a Greek Orthodox priest. He spoke languages ranging from Ancient Greek, Latin, Italian, French, German, and English, that would assist him in participating in organizing the Greek War of Independence and to build the "Orphanotropheio" (Ὀρφανοτροφεῖο; Greek for "Orphanage"), a progressive school that utilized the modern university system. Kairis studied with Benjamin of Lesbos at the school of Kydonies, Asia Minor, and was introduced to contemporary science and Greek interpretations of natural science.

Kairis studied in Pisa and Paris, and subscribed to the ideology of the Age of Enlightenment. He studied mathematics, natural sciences and philosophy. Kairis also had an interest in archaeology, making some major findings upon his native island of Andros. He also had an interest in botany and cataloged many of the plants of his local area, as well as documenting pharmacological properties of various plants.

== Revolutionary activities ==
Starting from 1811 he led Greek language high schools in Asia Minor. Eventually, he took an active part (1819–1826) in the Greek War of Independence and is now considered as an important figure in the history of Modern Greece.

On 10 May 1821 Theophilos Kairis, one of the leading intellectuals of the Greek Revolution, declared the War of Independence by raising the Greek flag at the cliffside church of St George on the island of Andros, and issued a Rhetoras, swaying shipowners and merchants to contribute funds and contribute ships to build a Greek Navy to combat the Ottoman Empire.

Many of the orphans from the Greek War of Independence, especially from the massacre from the island of Psara would form the body of the Orphanotropheio, in which Kairis taught many of the ideas learned from Philhellenes from all over Europe. Hence, this was the first true European university of Greece.

Though he was an ordained priest, Kairis fought in the War of Independence and was severely wounded in battle. Towards the end of the war, he was selected to draft the verbiage for Greece's Constitution, however when the European Great powers of the time installed Otto von Wittelsbach as a kind of Viceroy of the Powers he was not ready to integrate himself into the new system. King Otto offered him the position of Director of the University of Athens and awarded him the Gold Cross for his contribution to the war, but Kairis turned both of these down. Instead, he continued to teach radical ideas of the Enlightenment which brought him into conflict with the King and with the Eastern Orthodox Church. Following his conviction by the Holy Synod in 1839, was confined to the monastery in political exile on the island of Skiathos. He had been located to Syros for trial but died in 1853, 10 days before his judicial hearing, of natural causes.

== Orphanotropheio of Theophilos Kairis ==
Kairis, along with a few disciples, founded a pietistic revivalist movement known as Theosebism, inspired by the French revolutionary cults, radical Protestantism and deism. This movement was anathematised by the Synod of the Patriarchate of Constantinople.

Beginning with 1826, Kairis dedicated himself to an institute for orphans of the Greek revolution on Andros. The "Orphantropheio", or orphan school, presented Kairis with the opportunity to introduce to the Greek education system a wide range of subjects ranging from comparative religion, astronomy, ship navigation, agriculture, applied mathematics, accounting, natural science, advanced mathematics, and Theosebism.

Members of the Orphanotripheio represented children from all sides of the Balkan conflict, with individuals from Bulgaria, Muslim Turks displaced by the Revolution, and Catholics who had inhabited the Greek island since the Middle Ages.

In fact, Kairis had a very different vision for an independent Greece, one that was based upon the concept of separation of church and state as proposed by Thomas Jefferson. Kairis advocated for a pan-Balkan state similar to the United States, that preserved the cosmopolitan nature of the post-Byzantine Empire era, where all creeds were equally free of tyranny from the oppressive Ottomans.

This was the prelude of the so-called Eastern Question, the gradual dismemberment of the decaying Ottoman Empire by the Great powers.

== The Kairis Library ==
The library is housed in a neoclassical building, in Hora (or Andros Town) and contains about 3,000 tomes from the collection of Theophilos Kairis. In the library are also exposed a large number of rare publications, manuscripts, historical records, works of art and a small archaeological collection. Within the records, extensive letters demonstrating a network of intellectuals would update Kairis about the trends in European science and philosophy.

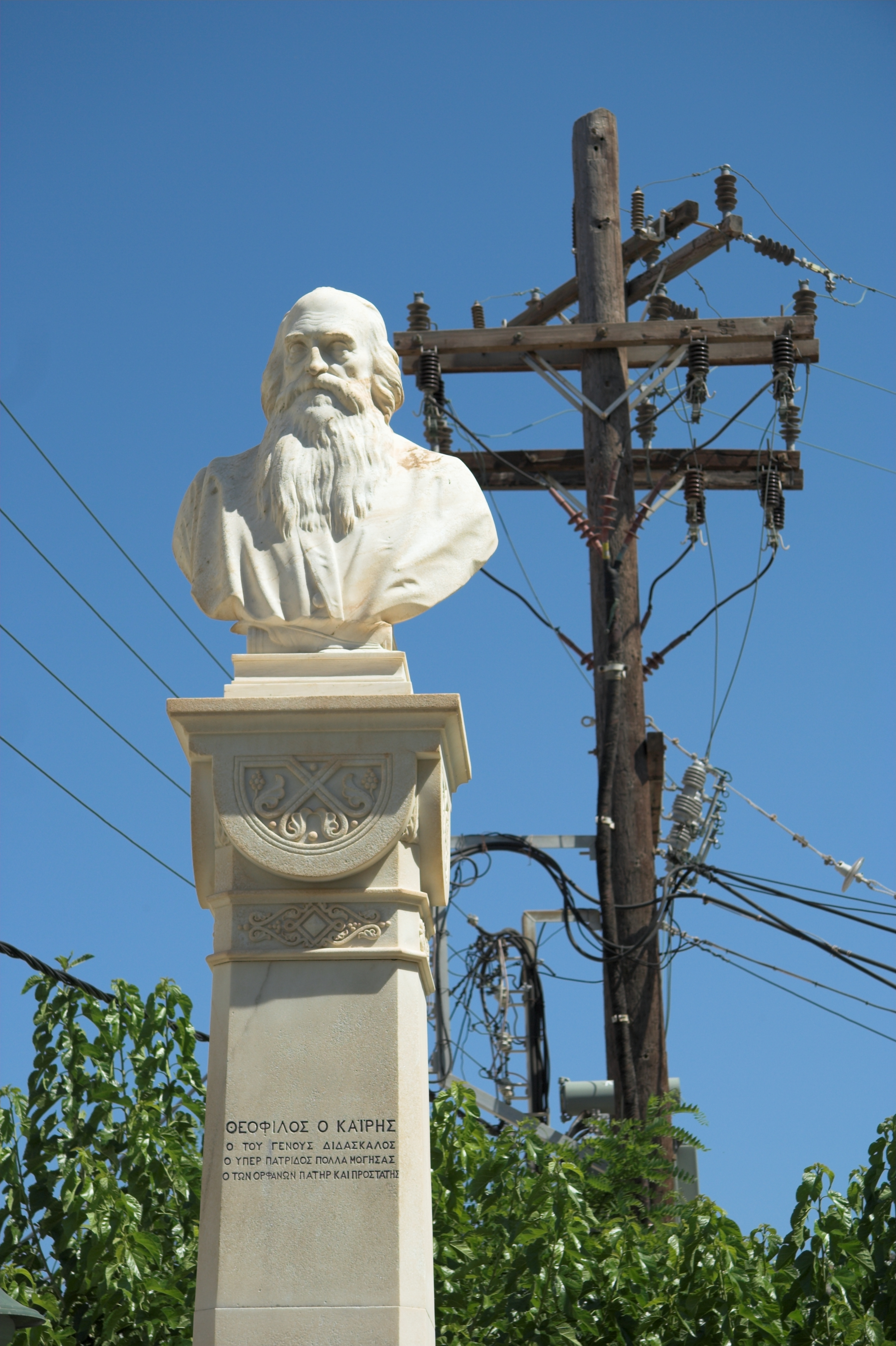
Bust in Andros

Also the mathematical treatises of Kairis are present, representing a very active and original intellect, who had written on complex themes, including on mathematical extensions of Pierre-Simon Laplace's Celestial Mechanics. Artifacts that demonstrate Kairis philosophic approach to understanding the energies (energiki ousia phiseos) of nature remain in the library, and highlight Kairis knowledge of Joseph Fourier's work on energy. Through various letters and correspondence, Kairis's approach to communicating with the various philhellenes demonstrates a network of intellectuals that were involved with the French Revolution. Kairis has been referred to as the "new Socrates" and was very active in didactic education. The island of Andros has a series of water fountains, and horizontal windmills constructed at the time the students from the orphanotropio were active on the Island, and represent applications from the Kairiki lessons.

One can find books by Professor Mavromatis in the library, who edited Kairis's mathematical work, focusing on how Kairis use the Newtonian binomial to find the roots of cardinal numbers.

Kairis was in constant communication with western intellectuals from Andros, and had communicated with Auguste Comte, and wrote on his treatises on sociology, then a newly emerging subject. Kairis has also incorporated these ideas into the curriculum of the orphanotropheio. Comte's ideas were tremendously influential on Kairis in the later years of the orphanotropheio, especially the idea that social ills can be solved as advocated by Jeremy Bentham.

Kairis spoke many languages and was interested in teaching philosophy from the ancient Greeks, translating the great poetry and theatre from antiquity, as well as the philosophic treatises of Aristotle and Plato. Furthermore, lessons on the progressive subject of comparative religion was to be invaluable for the would-be ship captains and merchants embarked on international trade. Kairis would teach theosphitism, but in the context of world religions, ranging from Buddhism, many describing the philosophical thought of Kairis similar in vein as with the Transcendentalism of Henry David Thoreau and Ralph Waldo Emerson.

Kiaris emphasised poetry as part of the curriculum and taught Lord Byron's work, Robert Browning as well as poetry from the French and German speaking west. This was to create a naturalist and metaphysical aptitude balanced with the natural sciences and mathematics.

The school was disbanded after Kairis was declared a heretic, but many of the orphanotropio would go on into the shipping professions, and were also versed in accounting and probability. Of notable family names who can trace back ancestors who were schooled by Kairis were the Goulandris and Emberikos families. Other students hid in the surrounding mountains, taking with them the banned books from the school, and continued to live with the inhabitants of the island working and building some of the most interesting windmills in Greece.

Indeed, Kairis had also taught his students the early field of Archeology, and conducted field trips on the island to the place he had discovered the ruins of a temple dedicated to Aphrodite prior to the Greek revolution.

To this day, every summer, art exhibitions are organized in the new exhibition area of the library.

== See also ==
- Maximiani Portas
