= Washington State Labor Council =

The Washington State Labor Council is the Washington branch of the AFL–CIO. It represents all AFL–CIO affiliates in state politics, and its major interest group, particularly for Democratic politicians. The organization was split when several national unions broke from the AFL–CIO and formed the Change to Win Coalition, taking their state and local affiliates with them. Larry Brown has been the President of the State Labor Council since December 2018. Other prominent leaders have included Jeffrey Johnson, Rick Bender, Lou Stewart, Alan Link, and April Sims, the organization's current Secretary-Treasurer (equivalent to executive director). Sims is the first woman of color and the first black person to be elected as a WSLC executive officer.
