= Lykourgos Logothetis =

Samian Greek independence leader (1772–1850)

- Λυκούργος Λογοθέτης
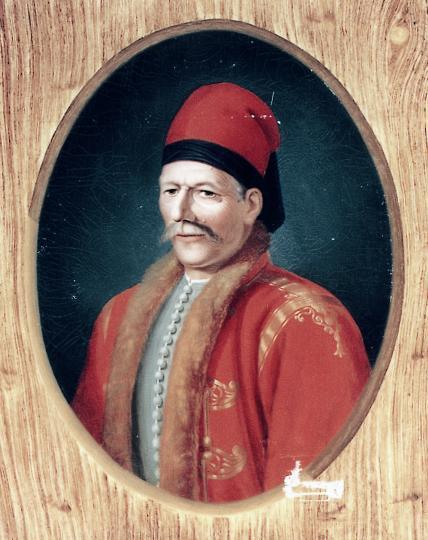
- Portrait of Logothetis by Dionysios Tsokos in the National Historical Museum.

Governor-General of Samos
- In office April 1821 – April 1828
- Preceded by: Position established
- Succeeded by: Ioannis Kolettis
- In office July 1830 – 1833
- Preceded by: Ioannis Kolettis
- Succeeded by: Position disestablished

Personal details
- Born: Georgios Paplomatas; Γεώργιος Παπλωματάς; 10 February 1772 Samos, Eyalet of the Archipelago, Ottoman Empire (now Greece)
- Died: 25 March 1850 (aged 78) Kingdom of Greece

Military service
- Allegiance: Military-Political System of Samos (Greece) First Hellenic Republic
- Branch/service: Hellenic Army
- Battles/wars: Greek War of Independence; Chios Massacre

Lykourgos Logothetis (Greek: Λυκούργος Λογοθέτης, 10 February 1772 – 25 May 1850 (O.S.)), born Georgios Paplomatas, was a Samian who became the island's leader during the Greek War of Independence.

On the outbreak of the Greek War of Independence he returned to Samos and was quickly elected the island's political and military leader, founding the "Military-Political System of Samos", which he led until 1833, with the exception of the period 1828–30, when Samos was administered as part of the nascent Greek state. Logothetis was head of the Greek forces during the unsuccessful campaign to Chios in 1822, which led to the massacre and destruction of the island and was heavily criticized for his actions.
