= Greek ship Psara =

Five ships of the Hellenic Navy have borne the name Psara (Ψαρά), named after the island of Psara, which played a major role in the Greek War of Independence:

- Psara (1830–1833), a sail corvette, renamed to Prinkips Maximilianos in 1833
- Greek auxiliary ship Psara (1880–1889), a former British freighter, used as a torpedo boat tender, renamed to Kanaris
- Greek ironclad Psara (1890–1932), a French-built ironclad warship
- Greek destroyer Psara (1933–1941), Dardo-class destroyer
- Greek frigate Psara (1998–present), a Hydra-class (MEKO 200 type) frigate
