= USS Arnold J. Isbell =

Gearing-class destroyer

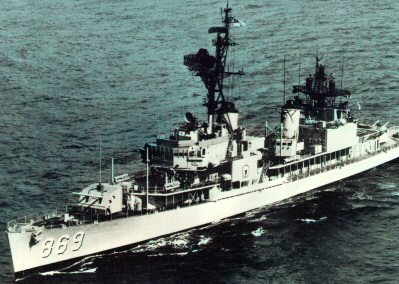
- USS Arnold J. Isbell, 1970

History

United States
- Name: USS Arnold J. Isbell
- Namesake: Arnold J. Isbell
- Laid down: 14 March 1945
- Launched: 6 August 1945
- Commissioned: 5 January 1946
- Stricken: 1 February 1974
- Identification: Callsign: NBGR; Hull number: DD-869
- Motto: Necede Malis
- Fate: Sold to Greece, 1974

Greece
- Name: Sachtouris
- Namesake: Georgios Sachtouris
- Acquired: 1974
- Identification: Pennant number: D214
- Fate: Scrapped, 2002

General characteristics
- Class & type: Gearing-class destroyer
- Displacement: 2,425 tons
- Length: 390 ft 6 in (119 m)
- Beam: 40 ft 10 in (12 m)
- Draft: 18 ft 6 in (6 m)
- Propulsion: 60,000 shp (45,000 kW); General Electric geared turbines, 2 screws
- Speed: 36.8 knots (68.2 km/h; 42.3 mph)
- Range: 4,380 nmi (8,110 km; 5,040 mi) at 20 knots (37 km/h; 23 mph)
- Complement: 11 officers and 345 enlisted
- Armament: 3 × twin 5-inch 38 caliber gun mounts; 12 × 40 mm AA guns; 8 × 20 mm AA guns; 2 × depth charge tracks (26 depth charges); 6 × K-Gun (30 depth charges); 10 × 21-inch (533 mm) torpedo tubes

USS Arnold J. Isbell (DD-869), a Gearing-class destroyer, was the only ship of the United States Navy to be named for Arnold J. Isbell, an aircraft carrier captain during World War II. The ship was laid down on 14 March 1945 at Staten Island, New York, by Bethlehem Mariners Harbor, launched on 6 August 1945 and commissioned on 5 January 1946. Constructed too late to see action in World War II, the vessel initially served as a training ship with the United States Atlantic Fleet, before transferring to the Pacific and deploying to Korea during the Korean War and off the Vietnam coast during the Vietnam War. In 1972 Arnold J. Isbell was made part of the reserve training fleet and in 1974, sold to Greece where the ship was renamed Satchouris and served with the Hellenic Navy until being sold for scrap in 2002.

== Construction and US career ==
Her keel was laid down on 14 March 1945 at Staten Island, New York, by Bethlehem Mariners Harbor. She was launched on 6 August 1945 sponsored by Mrs. Arnold J. Isbell, the widow of Captain Isbell; and commissioned on 5 January 1946. She joined the Atlantic Fleet and operated off the east coast.

Following a shakedown cruise to Guantánamo Bay, Cuba, the destroyer joined the Atlantic Fleet and operated off the East Coast through the end of the year. In January 1947, she was transferred to the Pacific Fleet and homeported at San Diego, California. In May, Arnold J. Isbell departed California on her first western Pacific (WestPac) cruise. She visited Tsingtao and Shanghai, China, Hong Kong, Tokyo, and Yokosuka, Japan, Okinawa; and Apra Harbor, Guam, before returning to San Diego in December.

During 1948, the warship engaged in hunter/killer training and served as a training ship for Naval Reserve personnel. In February 1949, she sailed to Bremerton, Washington, for two months of upkeep. Following this work, she departed San Diego in April, bound for the Far East. The destroyer was in port at Shanghai and at Tsingtao, China, when each of these cities fell to Communist forces. She evacuated the American consul and his family from Tsingtao. She returned to San Diego in December.

=== Korean War ===
Arnold J. Isbell was operating out of San Diego when Communist forces invaded South Korea on 27 June 1950 and the Korean War began. She began preparations for an active role in the conflict. She joined Destroyer Division (DesDiv) 52 and sailed for Korean waters on 6 November. Some of her duties in the combat zone included acting in the screen of Task Force (TF) 77 visiting Taiwan as part of the United States Seventh Fleet, and escorting the troop transports that brought the 45th Infantry Division to Hokkaidō, Japan. In May 1951, the destroyer was reassigned to Task Force 95 and participated in the bombardment of enemy troop concentrations on highways and railroads at Songjin, Chongjin, and Wonsan before returning to San Diego in August for repairs and training exercises along the west coast.

In January 1952, the ship again got underway for Korean action. Between 19 February and 10 August, she acted as a unit of TF 77, the Seventh Fleet striking force. Arnold J. Isbell also operated with TF 95 and took part in hunter/killer operations. For a short time, she was a member of the Taiwan Strait patrol and joined the cruiser USS Saint Paul in bombarding Songjin before she returned to the United States in August. Arnold J. Isbell then began a three-month overhaul at Bremerton, Washington, in the Puget Sound Naval Shipyard.

The destroyer sailed on 21 July 1953 for more operations off the embattled Korean peninsula. Upon her arrival there, she joined TF 95 for patrols along the Korean coast. A highlight of the cruise was her escorting the battleship USS New Jersey into Pusan harbor, where President Syngman Rhee presented the Seventh Fleet with a unit citation from the Republic of Korea. Arnold J. Isbell also served a brief stint as a training ship for the Nationalist Chinese Navy at Kaohsiung, Taiwan. Returning to the Korean coast, she acted as a rescue and communications ship at Pusan during a major fire. In January 1954, the ship and her sister members of DesDiv 112 (Destroyer Squadron 11) escorted released Nationalist Chinese prisoners of war to Keelung, Taiwan.

=== Post Korean War ===
February found Arnold J. Isbell back in the United States and being overhauled by the Mare Island Naval Shipyard, Mare Island, California. Her next six and one-half months were devoted to yard work and refresher training. In September, Arnold J. Isbell returned to the Far East. She again served as a training ship for Nationalist Chinese naval forces and then steamed with the fast carrier task force in Philippine waters. The destroyer played a key role in the evacuation of the Tachen Islands in January 1955 as Nationalist forces shortened their lines of defense. She sailed from the area on 25 February for San Diego, arriving in her home port on 13 March. Following repairs and training, Arnold J. Isbell sailed on 27 September for the Far East. The destroyer visited various ports in Japan and Taiwan, and served on the Taiwan Strait patrol. During this tour, she also participated in successful search and rescue operations for a downed Navy patrol plane. Elmo Zumwalt took command of the ship in July 1955. Arnold J. Isbell concluded her duties and arrived back in San Diego on 11 March 1956.

After completing repairs at Mare Island in July, Arnold J. Isbell resumed operations with DesDiv 112 off the coast of California. On 25 September, she sailed, via Pearl Harbor, for her eighth WestPac deployment. Heading south from Hawaii the destroyer crossed the equator on 3 October, bound for Samoa. Upon leaving Pago Pago, her next stop was Wellington, New Zealand, en route to Manus in the Admiralty Islands. Following a brief visit to Guam, she finally reached Yokosuka, Japan. There, the ship joined TF 77 for operations in the area between Hong Kong and Japan. She stopped in the Philippines before returning via Midway Atoll and Pearl Harbor, to San Diego where she arrived in March 1957. The warship had a brief availability period and then took part in a fleet training exercise. She later operated with the Navy's first nuclear-powered submarine, USS Nautilus. Arnold J. Isbell also visited Portland, Oregon, for that city's Rose Festival celebration. An 18-day nonstop voyage from San Diego to Brisbane, Australia, initiated the destroyer's ninth Far Eastern cruise. She made stops at the Admiralty Islands, Guam, the Philippines, Hong Kong, Taiwan, Okinawa, and Japan before returning to California in June 1958. The destroyer received an overhaul at Mare Island from June until September and then conducted refresher training and prepared for her 10th WestPac cruise.

Arnold J. Isbell got underway on 18 December for WestPac. She operated with the Taiwan Strait patrol and took part in training exercises off Guam, Taiwan, Japan, and Okinawa before returning to San Diego on 29 May 1959 for operations in the southern California area. The vessel participated in numerous fleet exercises and, from 27 June to 15 August, held a midshipman training cruise. The ship once again sailed for the Far East on 6 February 1960 and made stops at Pearl Harbor, Yokosuka, Kaohsiung, Hong Kong, and Subic Bay. At midnight on 20 April, she received orders to steam toward a sinking merchant vessel in the South China Sea. After reaching the scene of the disaster, Arnold J. Isbell was able to rescue 104 people. After delivering the survivors to Subic Bay, she proceeded to Hong Kong for three weeks as station ship at that port. A final stop at Yokosuka preceded her sailing for San Diego, where she arrived in June. The destroyer spent the next 12 months in local operations.

In June 1961, her home port was changed to Bremerton, Washington, where she entered the Puget Sound Naval Shipyard for a fleet rehabilitation and modernization (FRAM) overhaul. During the FRAM refit all secondary armament was removed, as well as No. 2 five-inch turret, which was replaced by two Mk32 triple torpedo tube launchers. The superstructure was extensively rebuilt of aluminum, the bridge enclosed and a new CIC (Combat Information Center) built between the pilothouse and the forward funnel. An Antisubmarine Rocket (ASROC) launcher was fitted between the funnels. A hangar and ASROC reload facility was constructed aft of the rear funnel.

Arnold J. Isbell emerged from the yard with her new configuration on 4 May 1962. On 7 June, she reported to her new home port of Long Beach, California, and commenced refresher training. In October, the ship sailed with Destroyer Squadron 11 for the Far East. During this deployment, she took part in Operation "Red Wheel," "Glass Door," and "Sea Serpent." The destroyer also served as a unit of the Seventh Fleet hunter/killer groups. Upon returning to Long Beach in June 1963, she participated in another fleet exercise, Operation "Saddle Soap". In January 1964, the warship left Long Beach for her 12th tour in Far Eastern waters. During this deployment, she operated with a carrier force and later joined the Taiwan Strait patrol. Arnold J. Isbell visited Pearl Harbor, Subic Bay, Philippines, Hong Kong; and Sasebo, Japan, before returning to Long Beach in May. She began a regular overhaul at the Long Beach Naval Shipyard in August. Upon completing her yard work in November, the destroyer proceeded to San Diego for six weeks of extensive underway training. Shortly after finishing her underway training, the ship took part in Operation "Silverlance." In March 1965, she received a drone antisubmarine helicopter (DASH) system and held trials of her new equipment off San Clemente Island. A midshipman training cruise occupied a large part of her summer. The destroyer sailed on 19 October for the Western Pacific. Following stops at Pearl Harbor and Subic Bay, Arnold J. Isbell relieved the destroyer Brinkley Bass on 30 December on the northern search and rescue (SAR) station in the Gulf of Tonkin and began her first duty in the combat zone off the coast of Vietnam. The warship then became a unit of TF 77.

Search and rescue duties occupied the vessel until she was relieved on 31 March 1966 and sailed to Hong Kong for four days of rest and relaxation. On 12 April, she got underway to return to the United States. After fuel stops at Midway and Pearl Harbor, Arnold J. Isbell reached Long Beach on 28 April and commenced a leave and upkeep period. She returned to sea on 11 June with a midshipman training cruise to Hawaii and several fleet exercises. The destroyer unloaded her ammunition at Seal Beach, California, on 29 July and entered the Mare Island Naval Shipyard on 31 July for overhaul. Refurbished, the ship began a training period on 16 September and spent the remainder of the year in exercises along the southern California coast and in upkeep during the Christmas holidays. Arnold J. Isbell held refresher training out of San Diego in March 1968 and then conducted local operations until getting underway for the western Pacific on 15 July. She arrived on station off the Vietnamese coast on 12 August and carried out duties as a gunfire support ship. Her routine was broken only by brief periods in port for repairs and liberty for the crew. The destroyer spent the Christmas holidays patrolling off Vietnam and then visited Subic Bay, and Yokosuka.

On 20 January, Arnold J. Isbell headed home. Upon her arrival at Long Beach on 31 January, she commenced a three-month period of leave and availability. She got underway again on 21 April for brief cruise to Acapulco and Manzanillo, Mexico, but was back in home port on 5 May. The vessel joined Task Group 10.1 on 9 June for a midshipman training cruise. Ports visited during this assignment included San Francisco, Seattle, Washington, and Pearl Harbor. This cruise terminated on 31 July, and she returned to Long Beach. A tender availability alongside the destroyer tender Isle Royal ensued, and the destroyer then took part in Exercise "Bell Express" from 16 to 22 September. Her next underway period lasted from 17 September to 21 November while she took part in Computex 31–69. She was also involved in gunfire support, antisubmarine warfare, and electronic warfare exercises before ending the year 1969 in port at Long Beach.

=== Vietnam War ===
The destroyer sailed on 13 February 1970 for the Far East. While in the combat zone, she performed SAR duty on Yankee Station in the Gulf of Tonkin, provided gunfire support, and served as escort for five aircraft carriers. She made four port calls to Subic Bay, visited Hong Kong for two weeks, and spent four days in Singapore. En route back to the United States, the ship paid goodwill visits to Sydney, Australia, and Auckland, New Zealand. A one-day stopover at Pago Pago was also included in the voyage to Pearl Harbor. Arnold J. Isbell finally arrived in home port on 29 August and spent the rest of 1970 in local operations out of Long Beach. From February to May 1971, Arnold J. Isbell went through an extensive yard period in the Long Beach Naval Shipyard. Six weeks of rigorous refresher training followed, and, on 9 September, she began what proved to be her final WestPac deployment. During this deployment, the vessel acted as a carrier escort and a naval gunfire support ship in Vietnamese waters. The destroyer also paid a visit to Devonport, Tasmania. On 7 April 1972, she dropped anchor at San Diego.

Then preparations to place the destroyer in the reserve training fleet were carried out. Arnold J. Isbell began her training duties on 16 June by sailing for Hawaii. She returned to California on 17 July and began operations off the West Coast. A trip to Mazatlán, Mexico varied her routine in early November.

== Greek service ==
In 1972 Isbell became part of the Reserve Training Fleet until early 1974 when she was decommissioned and struck from the Naval Vessel Register. She was then transferred to the government of Greece and entered the Greek Navy as Sachtouris (D214). She continued serving Greece into the 1980s and was reportedly scrapped in Turkey in 2002.

== Awards and honors ==
Arnold J. Isbell made 16 tours of the Far East and earned six battle stars for Korean War service and two for Vietnam War action.
