= Dimitrios Papanikolis =

Greek naval officer (1790–1855)

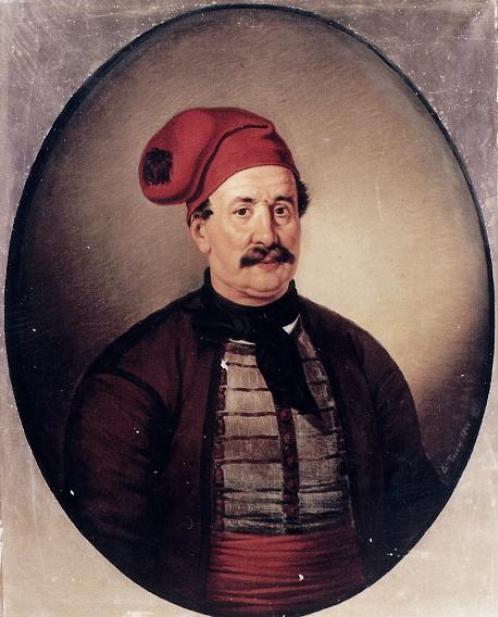
- Portrait by Dionysios Tsokos
- Native name: Δημήτριος Παπανικολής
- Born: c. 1790; Psara, Eyalet of the Archipelago, Ottoman Empire (now Greece)
- Died: c. 1855; Athens, Kingdom of Greece
- Allegiance: First Hellenic Republic; Kingdom of Greece
- Branch: Hellenic Navy
- Commands: Nelson; Amalia
- Battles / wars: Barbary Wars; First Barbary War; Greek War of Independence; Battle of Gerontas

Dimitrios Papanikolis (Greek: Δημήτριος Παπανικολής) (c. 1790–1855) was a naval hero of the Greek Revolution, famous for being the first to successfully employ a fireship to destroy an Ottoman ship of the line.

== Life ==
Papanikolis was born on the island of Psara in 1790. At an early age he joined his father, Georgios, in his trading travels, and participated in fights with the corsairs of the Barbary Coast.

During the first months of the Greek War of Independence, the Greek naval vessels, mostly converted and armed merchantmen, were unable to confront the larger and better-armed Ottoman warships. The rebels therefore decided to use fireships. Papanikolis volunteered for the first attempt, which was carried out successfully on 8 June [O.S. 27 May] 1821 in the harbour of Eressos in Lesbos, where the fireship destroyed an Ottoman two-deck frigate which lay in anchor there. This led to the generalized use of fireships by the Greeks, who were thus able to even the balance with the far more powerful Ottoman Navy. Papanikolis remained active for the remainder of the war, distinguishing himself again in the Battle of Gerontas in August 1824.

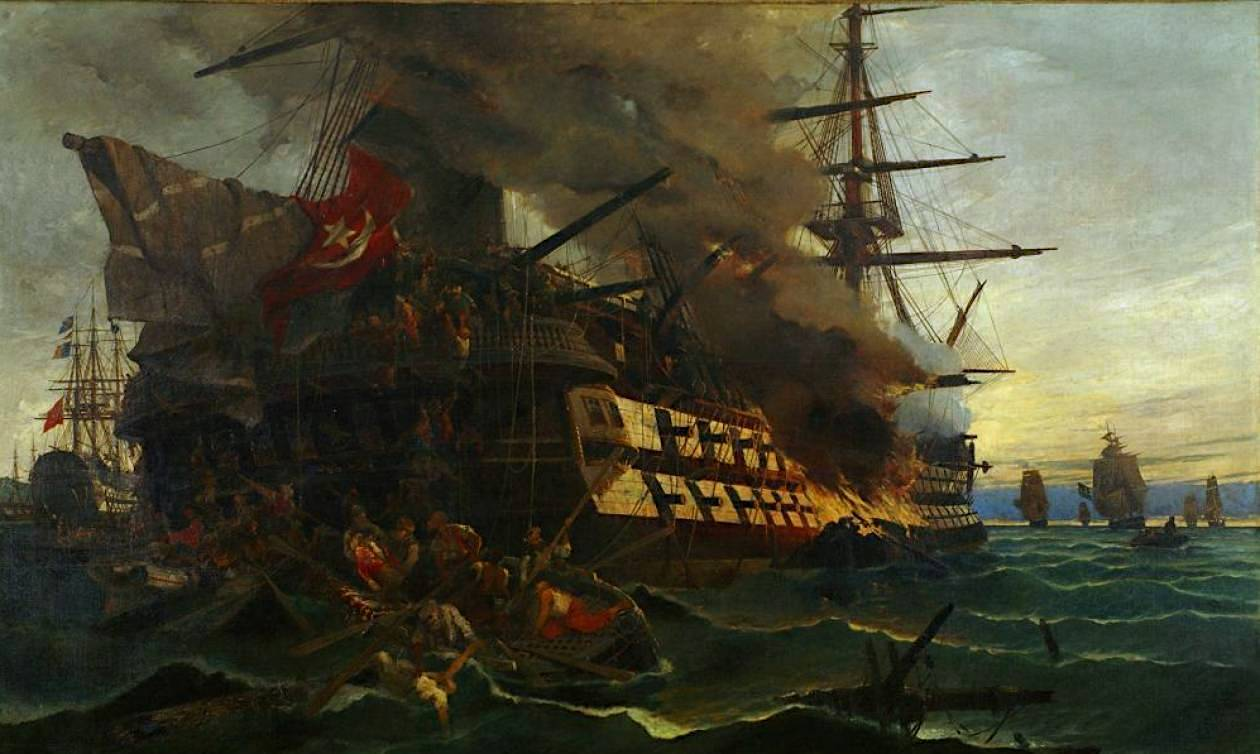
The burning of the Ottoman Two-decker at Eressos, painting by Konstantinos Volanakis

In 1829, after the war's end, he purchased a 1/3 share in the brig Nelson, and pursued trade with it until 1833, when the ship was purchased and commissioned into the Royal Hellenic Navy, with Papanikolis as captain. In 1836 however the ship sank after ramming a reef off Zakynthos, and Papanikolis was placed in suspended service until 1841, when he was given command of the corvette Amalia.

In 1843, after the 3 September 1843 Revolution, he was elected as a representative of Psara for the constituent assembly. In 1846, he was placed as chairman of the naval court, retaining the post until his death in 1855.

== Honours ==
In addition to several roads throughout Greece, three submarines of the Hellenic Navy have been named after him.
