= Psara =

Greek island in the Aegean Sea

Psara Ψαρά
- Municipality
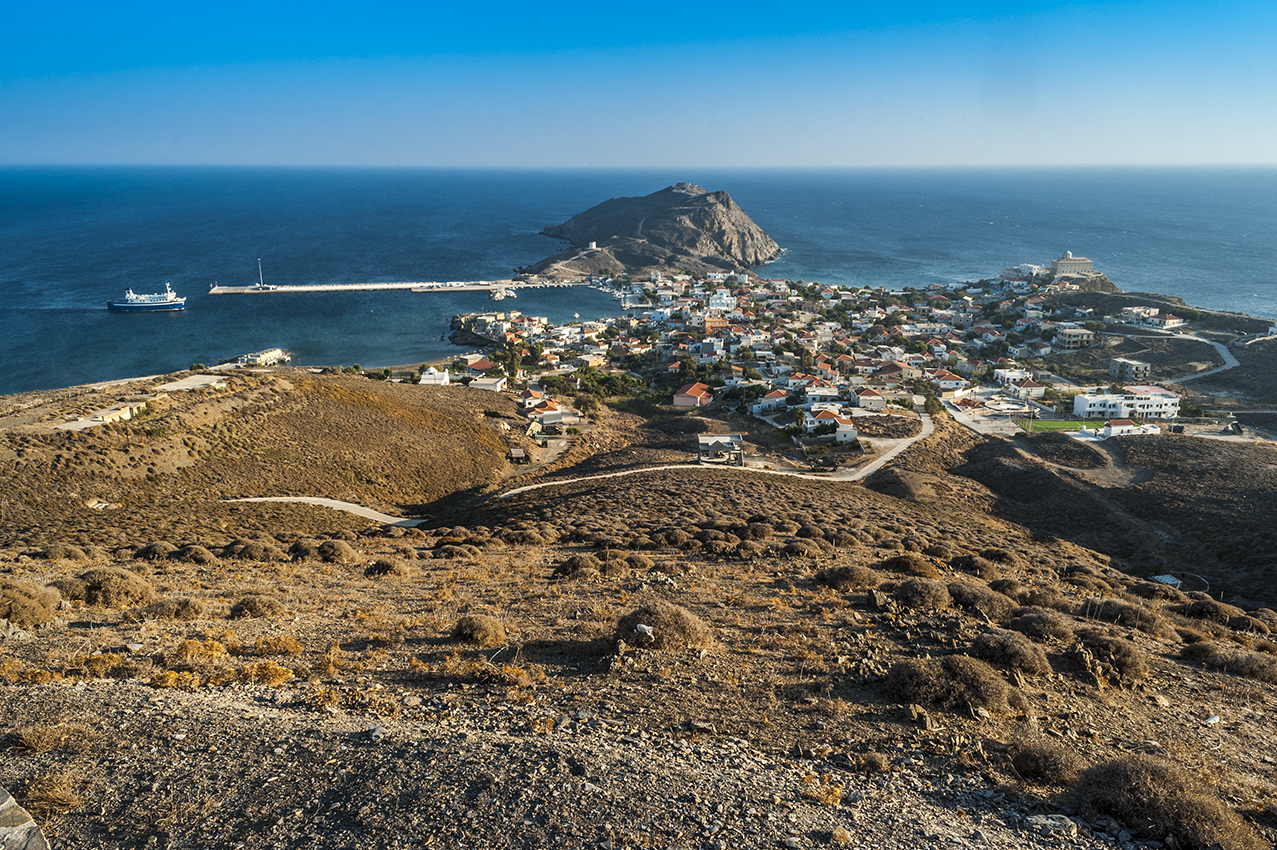
- Psara, Black Ridge

- Flag

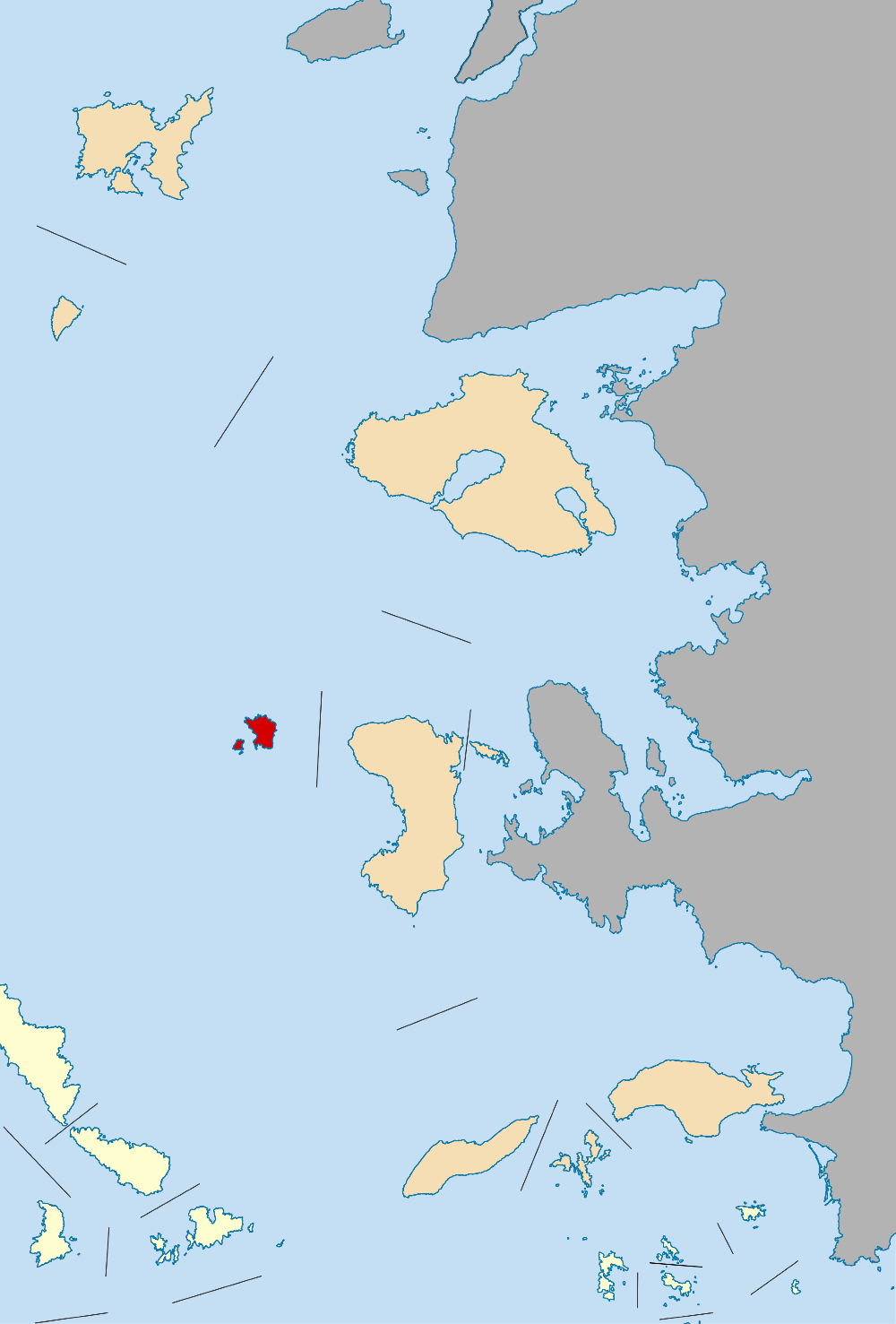

- Location within Greece
- Coordinates: 38°33′N 25°34′E
- Country: Greece
- Administrative region: North Aegean
- Regional unit: Chios

Area
  - Municipality: 44.511 km^{2} (17.186 sq mi)
- Highest elevation: 512 m (1,680 ft)
- Lowest elevation: 0 m (0 ft)

Population (2021)
  - Municipality: 420
  - Density: 9.4/km^{2} (24/sq mi)
- Time zone: UTC+2 (EET)
  - Summer (DST): UTC+3 (EEST)
- Postal code: 82x xx
- Area code: 22740
- Vehicle registration: ΧΙ
- Website: www.dimospsaron.gr

Psara (Greek: Ψαρά [ps̠aˈɾa]), known in ancient times as Psyra (Ψύρα) and Psyrie (Ψυρίη), is a Greek island in the Aegean Sea. Together with the small island of Antipsara, it forms the municipality of Psara. It is part of the Chios regional unit, which is part of the North Aegean region. The only town of the island and seat of the municipality is also called Psara.

Psara had 420 inhabitants according to the 2021 census. It has a small port linking to the island of Chios and other parts of Greece.

The municipality is officially named the Heroic Island of Psara, in recognition of the Destruction of Psara in 1824 during the Greek War of Independence, in which thousands of Greeks were massacred by Ottoman troops.

== Geography ==
Topographic map of Chios and Psara islands, situated in the Aegean Sea in Greece.

Psara lies 81 km (50 mi) northwest of Chios, 22 km (14 miles) from the northwestern point of the island of Chios and 150 km (93 mi) east-northeast of Athens. The length and width of the island are about 7 by 8 km (4 by 5 mi) and the area is 43 km^{2} (17 sq mi). The highest point on the island is "Profitis Ilias" (512 m (1,680 ft)). The municipality has total area of 44.511 km^{2} (17.186 mi^{2}).

== Flag ==
The modern flag of Psara is based largely on the island's famous revolutionary flag created by Psariot locals in 1824. The original flag, carried during the War of Independence by Psariot ships, was made of white cloth bordered with red. It bore the symbols of Filiki Eteria in red (a large cross atop a crescent, a spear, and an anchor). A snake was wrapped around the anchor, often depicted with a bird flying near its mouth. On either side of the Filiki Eteria symbols, in red capital letters, were the words ΕΛΕΥΘΕΡΙΑ Η ΘΑΝΑΤΟΣ (FREEDOM OR DEATH) and in some cases, the island's name, spelled ΨΑ–ΡΑ or ΨΑΡ–ΡΑ. An original 1824 flag of Psara is preserved at the National Historical Museum of Greece.

Flag of Psara during the Greek War of Independence bearing the inscriptions ΕΛΕΥΘΕΡΙΑ Η ΘΑΝΑΤΟΣ (FREEDOM OR DEATH) and ΨΑ–ΡΑ (PSA–RA).

The flag of Psara currently in use has a very similar design but omits the island's name and bears a star below the crescent.

== History ==
Psara has been inhabited since the Mycenaean period, its inhabitants relying on the sea to make a living as the island is treeless and rocky with little shrubbery.

Homer, Strabo, Cratinus, Suda and Stephanus of Byzantium referred to the island as Psyra (Ancient Greek: Ψυρά, Ψύρα, and Ψυρίη).

The islanders' sole source of livelihood has always been fishing, mainly for the locally abundant slipper lobsters, and shipping, with some tourist development in recent years.

The Greek ancient proverb Psyra celebrating Dionysos (Ancient Greek: Ψύρα τὸν Διόνυσον ἄγοντες) originated from the fact that Psyra was a poor and small island which could not produce its own wine, and was used in reference to people who were reclining at a symposium but not drinking. Another ancient Greek proverb, You regard Sparta as Psyra (Ancient Greek: Ψύρα τε τὴν Σπάρτην ἄγεις), also expressed the poverty of the island.

During the Middle Ages Psara had a very small population, which abandoned the island for Chios after the Fall of Constantinople. Between the 14th and second half of the 15th century, a small group of Albanians settled on the island and developed an Arvanite community, but it was quickly assimilated into the local Greek population. In the 16th century, under the Ottoman rule, the Psariots who had previously left, returned to their homeland along with other settlers and established a settlement around the Palaiokastro fort which they repaired. They turned to trade, amassing great profits. By the beginning of the 19th century the Psariots had the third largest trade fleet in Greece after Hydra and Spetses, numbering some 45 ships.

== Destruction ==
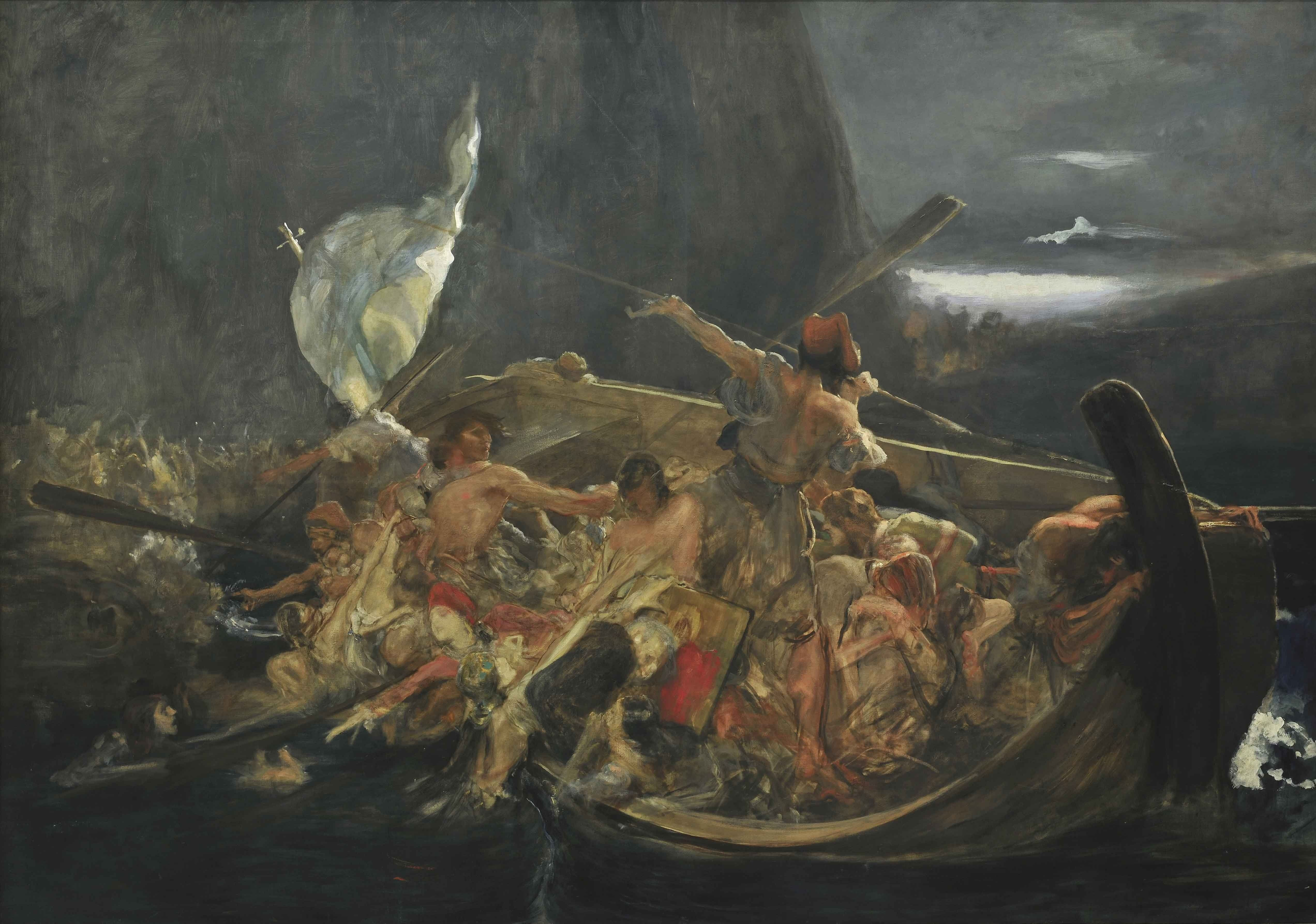
After the destruction of Psara by Nikolaos Gyzis.

Psara joined the Greek War of Independence on April 10, 1821. Future Prime Minister Konstantinos Kanaris, Dimitrios Papanikolis, Andreas Pipinos and Nikolis Apostolis distinguished themselves as naval leaders, using fire ships to combat the more powerful Ottoman Navy. Psara's native population of 7,500 people was further augmented by 23,000 refugees from Thessaly, Macedonia, Chios, Moschonisia and Kydonies.

On July 3 (June 21 O.S.), 1824, the island was invaded by the Turks. The resistance of the Psariots ended the next day with a last stand at the town's old fort of Palaiokastro (alternative name Mavri Rachi, literally "black ridge"). Hundreds of soldiers and also women and children had taken refuge there when an Ottoman force of 2,000 stormed the fort. The refugees first threw a white flag with the words "Ἐλευθερία ἤ Θάνατος" ("Eleftheria i Thanatos", "Freedom or Death"). Then, the moment the Turks entered the fort, the local Antonios Vratsanos lit a fuse to the gunpowder stock, in an explosion that killed the town's inhabitants along with their enemies — thus remaining faithful to their flag to their death. A French officer who heard and saw the explosion compared it to a volcanic eruption of Vesuvius.

A part of the population managed to flee the island, but those who did not were either sold into slavery or killed. As a result of the invasion, thousands of Greeks met a tragic fate. The island was deserted and surviving islanders were scattered through what is now Southern Greece. Theophilos Kairis, a priest and scholar, took on many of the orphaned children and developed the famous school the Orphanotropheio of Theophilos Kairis. Psara remained in the hands of the Ottomans until it was recaptured by the Greek navy on 21 October 1912 during the First Balkan War.

== Historical population ==
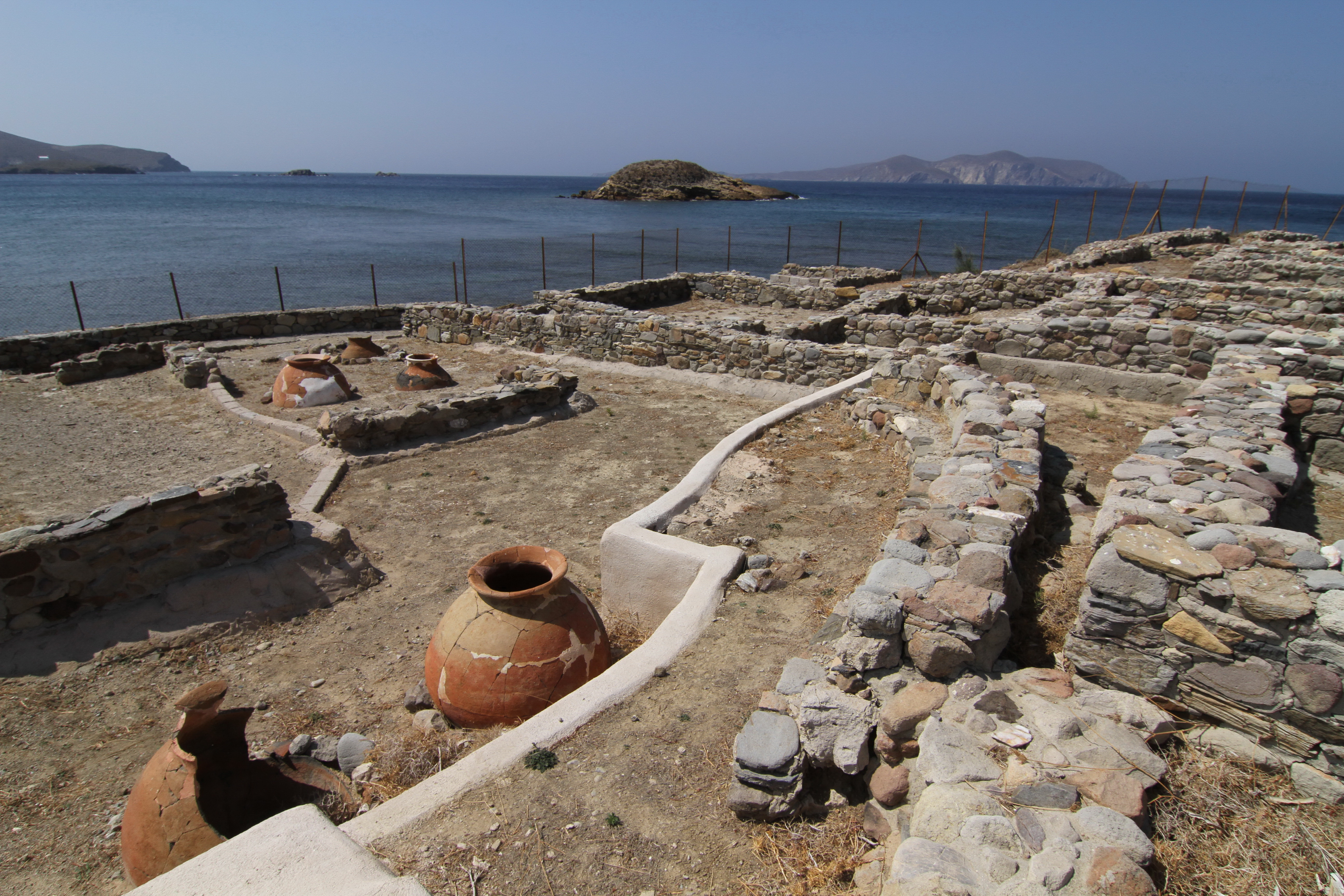
Archontiki archeological site in Psara.

A native of Psara is known in English as a Psariot or a Psarian.

Year	Population	Difference
1824	7,000	
1951	700	
1961	576	17.7%
1971	487	15.5%
1981	460	5.5%
1991	438	4.8%
2001	422	3.7%
2011	446	+ 5.7%
2021	420	5.8%

== Notable people ==
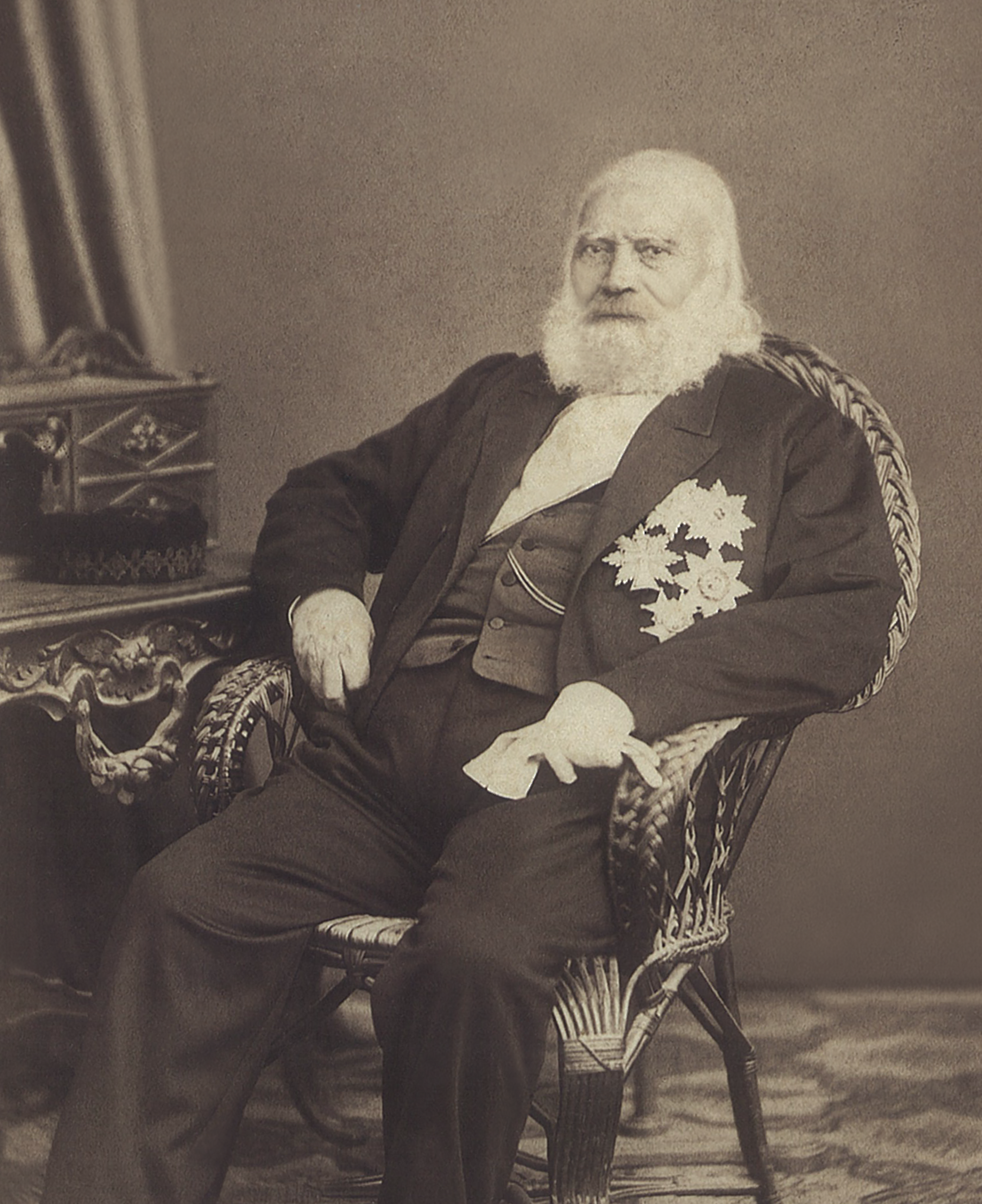
Konstantinos Kanaris.

Notable natives and inhabitants of the island include:

- Ioannis Varvakis (1745–1825), admiral, caviar merchant and benefactor.
- Nikolis Apostolis (1770–1827), admiral.
- Dimitrios Papanikolis (1790–1855), admiral.
- Konstantinos Kanaris (1793/1795–1877), admiral and politician, Prime Minister of Greece.
- Garafilia Mohalbi (1817–1830), Greek-American refugee and former slave.
- George Sirian (1818–1891), United States Navy officer.

== See also ==
- List of settlements in the Chios regional unit
- Greek ship Psara
- Destruction of Psara
