= Eleftheria i thanatos =

National motto of Greece

Flag of Greece

Eleftheria i thanatos (Greek: Ελευθερία ή θάνατος, IPA: [elefθeˈri.a i ˈθanatos]; 'Freedom or Death') is the motto of Greece. It originated in the Greek songs of resistance that were powerful motivating factors for independence. It was adopted in 1814 by the Filiki Eteria, a secret organization formed specifically for the overthrow of Ottoman rule.

== Overview ==
The motto arose during the Greek War of Independence in the 1820s, where it was a war cry for the Greeks who rebelled against Ottoman rule. It was adopted after the Greek War of Independence and is still in use today. One explanation for the 9 stripes on the Greek flag is that they represent the nine syllables of the motto, five blue stripes for the syllables Eleftheria and four white stripes for i thanatos. The motto symbolized and still symbolizes the resolve of the people of Greece against tyranny and oppression.

Part of the emblem of the Filiki Eteria were two flags with the letters ΗΕΑ and ΗΘΣ; These represent Ή ΕλευθερίΑ Ή ΘάνατοΣ, 'Either Freedom, or Death'. This is also the motto of the 4th Infantry Division of the Greek Army.

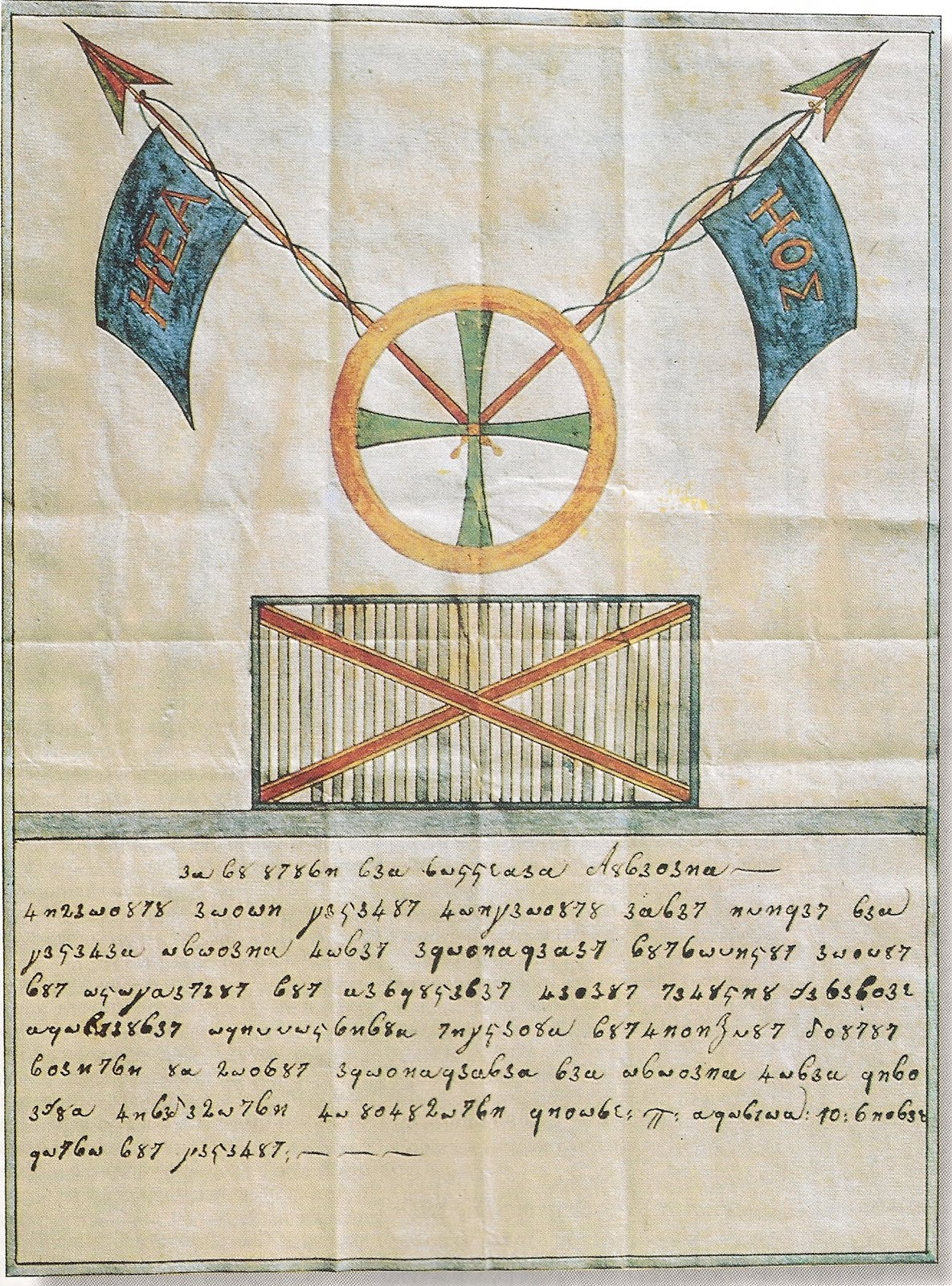
The emblem of Filiki Eteria with the letters ΗΕΑ and ΗΘΣ seen on the two blue flags. The letters are an abbreviation of the words Ή ΕλευθερίΑ Ή ΘάνατοΣ ('Freedom or Death').

== Cultural references ==
Nikos Kazantzakis' novel Captain Michalis was subtitled Freedom or Death, which became its title in the United States, Germany, France, and other countries.

== See also ==
- "Give me liberty or give me death!", 1775 quote by Patrick Henry
- "God Save the South", whose lyrics contain the battle cry "Freedom or death!"
- Greek War of Independence
- "Hymn to Liberty"
- Liberté, égalité, fraternité
- Flag of the Treinta y Tres
- Live Free or Die
- Patria o Muerte, Venceremos
- Thanatos
