= First Hellenic Republic =

1822–1832 unrecognized, provisional Greek state during the Greek Revolution

Coordinates: 37°33′56″N 22°47′47″E

Provisional Administration of Greece (1822–1827) Προσωρινὴ Διοίκησις τῆς Ἑλλάδος Hellenic State (1827–1832) Ἑλληνικὴ Πολιτεία
- 1822–1832
- National flag Seal of the Hellenic State (1827–1833)
- Motto: "Eleftheria i thanatos" Ελευθερία ή θάνατος "Freedom or Death"
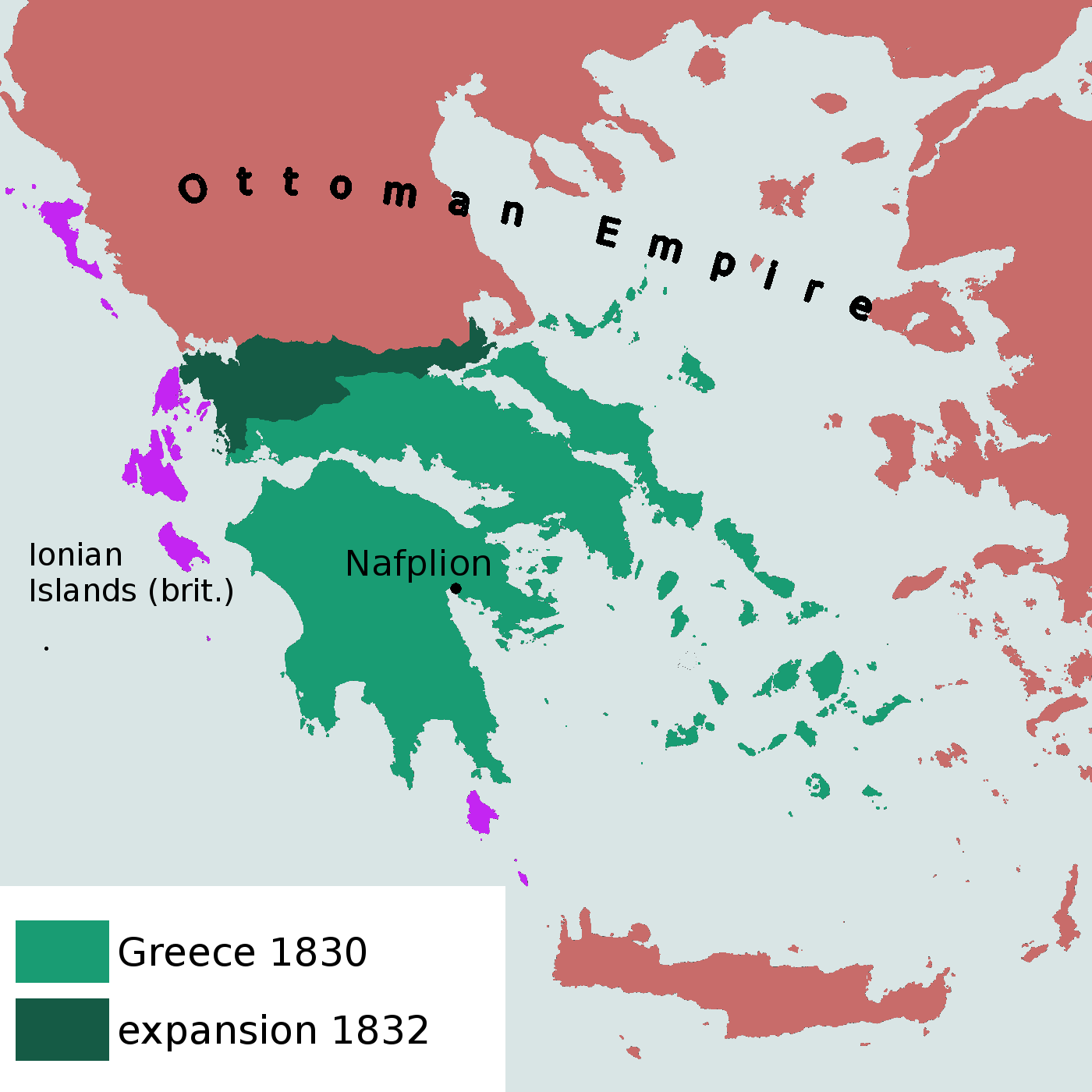
- Status: Unrecognized state (1822–1830); Provisional government (1822–1827)
- Capital: Nafplio (officially from 1827)
- Common languages: Greek
- Religion: Greek Orthodox
- Demonyms: Greek, Hellene
- Government: Unitary presidential republic
- President of the Executive
  - 1822–1823: Alexandros Mavrokordatos
  - 1823–1823: Petrobey Mavromichalis
  - 1823–1826: Georgios Kountouriotis
  - 1826–1827: Andreas Zaimis
- Governor
  - 1827–1831: Ioannis Kapodistrias
  - 1831–1832: Augustinos Kapodistrias
  - 1832–1833: Administrative Committee
- Legislature: National Assembly
- History
  - Start of Greek Revolution: 23 February 1821 (Wallachia); March 1821 (Peloponnese)
  - Proclamation of Independence: 1 January 1822
  - Recognition of Autonomy: 22 March 1829
  - Recognition of Independence: 3 February 1830
  - Treaty of Constantinople: 21 July 1832
  - Kingdom established: 30 August 1832
- Currency: Phoenix
Preceded by
Morea Eyalet
Eyalet of the Archipelago
Pashalik of Yanina
Bey of Mani
1828: Military-Political System of Samos
Succeeded by
Kingdom of Greece
1830: Military-Political System of Samos
- Today part of: Greece

The First Hellenic Republic (Greek: Α΄ Ελληνική Δημοκρατία) was the provisional Greek state during the Greek Revolution against the Ottoman Empire. From 1822 until 1827, it was known as the Provisional Administration of Greece, and between 1827 and 1832, it was known as the Hellenic State.

"First Hellenic Republic" is a historiographical term, which is used by academics and the Greek government to emphasize the constitutional and democratic nature of the revolutionary regime prior to the establishment of the independent Kingdom of Greece, and associate this period of Greek history with the later Second and Third Republics.

== History ==
=== Greek Revolution ===
In the first stages of the war, various areas elected their own regional governing councils.

=== Provisional Administration of Greece ===
These were replaced by a central administration at the First National Assembly of Epidaurus in early 1822, which also adopted the first Greek Constitution, marking the birth of the modern Greek state. The councils continued in existence, however, and central authority was not firmly established until 1824/25. The new state was not recognized by the Great Powers of the day, which, after initial successes, was threatened with collapse both from within due to civil war and from without through the victories of the Turco-Egyptian army of Ibrahim Pasha.

By 1827, the Greek revolution had almost been extinguished on the mainland excluding Nafplio, Mani and other mountainous regions of Peloponnese and Roumeli, but by this time the Great Powers had come to agree to the formation of an autonomous Greek state under Ottoman suzerainty, as stipulated in the Treaty of London. Ottoman refusal to accept these terms led to the Battle of Navarino, which effectively secured complete Greek independence.

=== Hellenic State ===
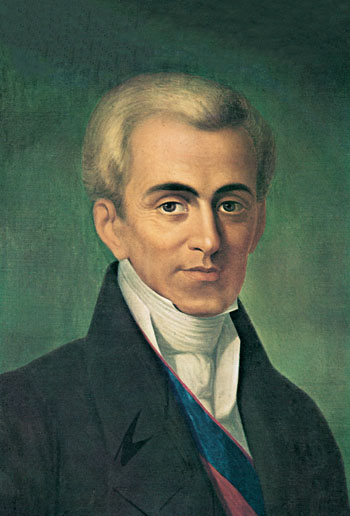
Ioannis Kapodistrias, Governor of Greece

In 1827, the Third National Assembly at Troezen established the Hellenic State (Ἑλληνικὴ Πολιτεία) and selected Count Ioannis Kapodistrias as Governor of Greece. Therefore, this period is often called Governorate (Greek: Κυβερνείο). After his arrival in Greece in January 1828, Kapodistrias actively tried to create a functional state and redress the problems of a war-ravaged country, but was soon embroiled in conflict with powerful local magnates and chieftains.

During the period of 1828–1830, the island of Samos was incorporated into the Republic as part of the Eastern Sporades province.

Kapodistrias was assassinated by political rivals in 1831, plunging the country into renewed civil strife. He was succeeded by his brother Augustinos, who was forced to resign after six months. The Fifth National Assembly at Nafplion drafted a new royal constitution, while the three "Protecting Powers" (Great Britain, France and Russia) intervened, declaring Greece a Kingdom in the London Conference of 1832, with the Bavarian Prince Otto of Wittelsbach as king.

== Heads of the Executive ==
The following were the heads of government for the First Hellenic Republic:

=== Provisional Administration of Greece (1822–1827) ===
Head of state			Term of office			Title
No.	Portrait	Name (birth–death)	Took office	Left office	Time in office	Title
1		Alexandros Mavrokordatos; Αλέξανδρος Μαυροκορδάτος (1791–1865)	13 January 1822	10 May 1823	1 year, 117 days	President of the Executive
2		Petros Mavromichalis; Πέτρος Μαυρομιχάλης (Πετρόμπεης) (1765–1848)	10 May 1823	31 December 1823	235 days	President of the Executive
3		Georgios Kountouriotis; Γεώργιος Κουντουριώτης (1782–1858)	31 December 1823	26 April 1826	2 years, 116 days	President of the Executive
4		Andreas Zaimis; Ανδρέας Ζαΐμης (1791–1840)	26 April 1826	14 April 1827	353 days	President of the Government Commission

=== Hellenic State (1827–1832) ===
Governor			Term of office			Political party
No.	Portrait	Name (birth–death)	Took office	Left office	Time in office	Political party
1		Ioannis Kapodistrias; Ιωάννης Καποδίστριας (1776–1831)	14 April 1827	9 October 1831 (assassinated)	4 years, 178 days	Russian Party
2		Augustinos Kapodistrias; Αυγουστίνος Καποδίστριας (1778–1857)	9 October 1831	23 March 1832 (resigned)	166 days	Russian Party

== See also ==
- Ancient Greek democracy
- Ancient Greece
- Byzantine Greece
- Romioi
- Greek nationalism
