= Chios massacre =

1822 killing and enslavement of Greek people by Ottoman troops

- Part of Massacres during the Greek War of Independence
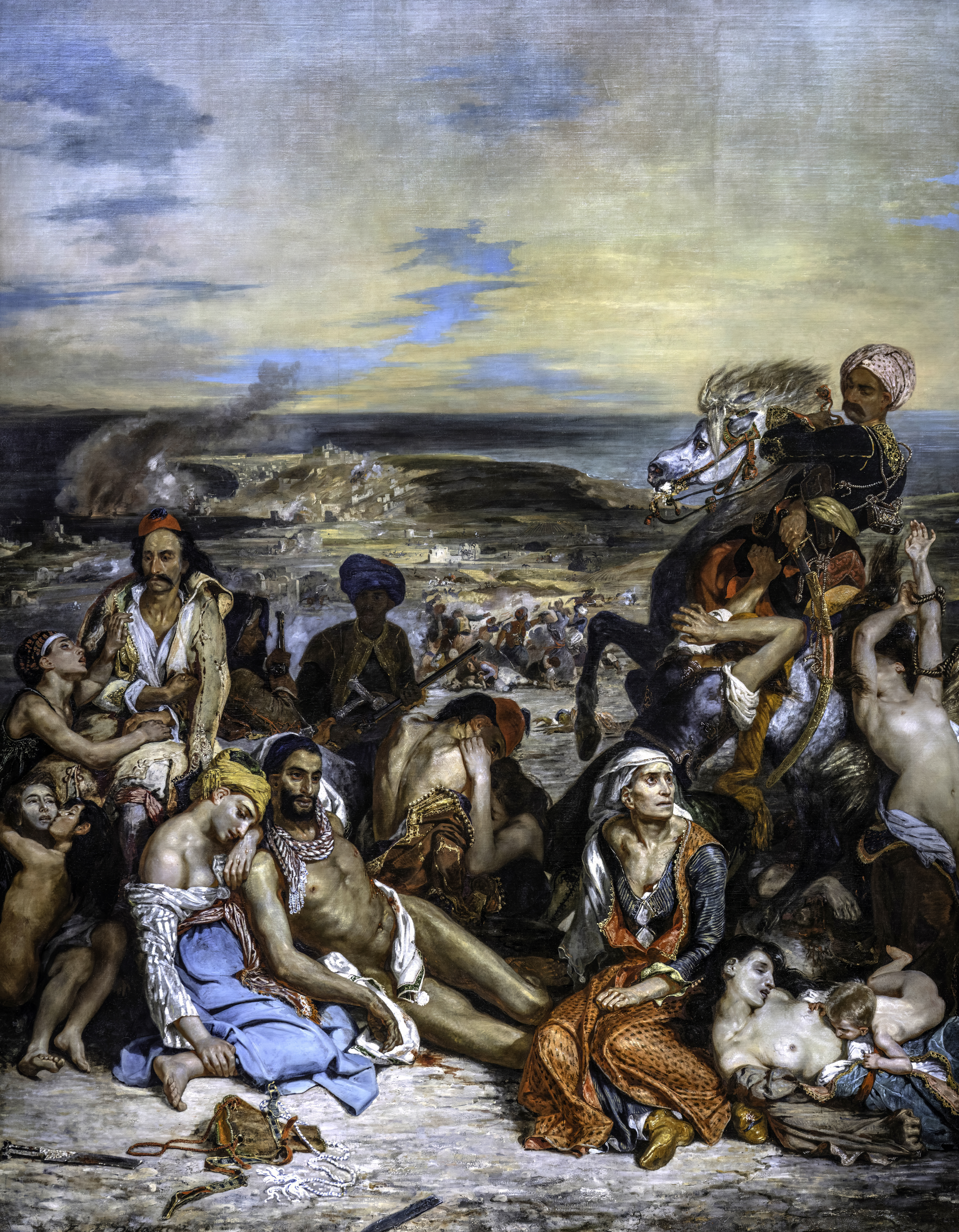
- The Massacre at Chios (1824) by Eugène Delacroix
- Location: 38.3640°N 26.0630°E; Chios, Ottoman Empire
- Date: March–August 1822
- Target: Greeks on the island of Chios
- Attack type: Massacre, mass murder, genocidal massacre, slavery, ethnic cleansing
- Victims: Up to 100,000 killed or enslaved. At least: 25,000–50,000 killed; 45,000–50,000 enslaved; 10,000–20,000 fled
- Perpetrator: Ottoman Empire: Ottoman military
- No. of participants: 30,000
- Motive: Anti-Greek sentiment, Anti-Christian sentiment, Ottoman colonialism, Turkification

The Chios massacre (Greek: Η σφαγή της Χίου, pronounced [i sfaˈʝi tis ˈçi.u]) was a catastrophe that resulted in the death, enslavement, and flight of about four-fifths of the total population of Greeks on the island of Chios by Ottoman troops during the Greek War of Independence in 1822. It is estimated that up to 100,000 people were killed or enslaved during the massacre, while up to 20,000 escaped as refugees. Greeks from neighboring islands had arrived on Chios and encouraged the Chians to join their revolt. In response, Ottoman troops landed on the island and killed thousands. The massacre of Christians provoked outrage across the Western world and led to increasing support for the Greek cause worldwide.

== Background ==
For over 2,000 years, merchants and shipowners from Chios had been prominent in trade and diplomacy throughout the Black Sea, the Aegean, and the Mediterranean. The Ottoman Empire allowed Chios almost complete control over its own affairs as Chian trade and the very highly valued mastic plant, harvested only on Chios, were of great value to the Ottomans. The cosmopolitan Chians were also very prominent in Constantinople. Following the massacre, however, the island never regained its commercial prominence.

The island's ruling classes were reluctant to join the Greek revolt, fearing the loss of their security and prosperity. Furthermore, they were aware that they were situated far too close to the Turkish heartland in Anatolia to be safe. At some points, Chios is only 6.7 kilometres (4.2 mi) from the Anatolian mainland, across the Chios Strait.

== Massacre ==
In March 1822, as the Greek revolt gathered strength on the mainland, several hundred armed Greeks from the neighbouring island of Samos landed in Chios. They attacked the Turks, who retreated to the citadel. Many islanders also decided to join the revolution. However, the vast majority of the population had by all accounts done nothing to provoke the reprisals, and had not joined other Greeks in their revolt against the Ottoman Empire.

Reinforcements in the form of a Turkish fleet under the Kapudan Pasha Nasuhzade Ali Pasha arrived on the island on 22 March. They quickly pillaged and looted the town. On 12 April [O.S. 31 March], orders were given to burn down the town, and over the next four months, an estimated 30,000 Turkish troops arrived. The British warship HMS Seringapatam was on duty in the Mediterranean under the command of Captain Samuel Warren. On 7 May she passed the island of Chios (then called Scio in English), saw it in flames, and received signals from Greek ships asking for help, but being under orders to observe strict neutrality in the Greek War of Independence the ship gave no assistance and proceeded on her way. Approximately four-fifths of the total population of 100,000 to 120,000 prior of the catastrophe, were killed, enslaved, or had to take refuge outside of Chios; it is estimated that up to 100,000 were killed or enslaved. At least 25,000 were killed, 45,000 enslaved, and 10,000 to 20,000 fled. Estimates of the number of those slaughtered ran upward of 50,000, with an equal number enslaved. Tens of thousands of survivors dispersed throughout Europe and became part of the Chian diaspora. Some young Greeks enslaved during the massacre were adopted by wealthy Ottomans and converted to Islam. Some rose to levels of prominence in the Ottoman Empire, such as Georgios Stravelakis (later renamed Mustapha Khaznadar) and Ibrahim Edhem Pasha.

== Reaction and commemoration ==
There was outrage when the events were reported in Europe and French painter Eugène Delacroix created a painting depicting the events that occurred; his painting was named Scenes from the Massacres of Chios. Thomas Barker of Bath painted a fresco of the massacre on the walls of Doric House, Bath, Somerset.

A draft of this painting, created under the supervision of Delacroix in his lab by one of his students, is in display in the Athens War Museum. In 2009, a copy of the painting was displayed in the local Byzantine museum on Chios. It was withdrawn from the museum in November 2009 in a "good faith initiative" for the improvement of Greek-Turkish relations. However, the Greek press protested its removal. The copy is now back on display in the museum.

Victor Hugo's collection of poems Les Orientales, published in 1829, include the poem "L'Enfant" ("The Child") devoted to the massacre of Chios. The American poet William Cullen Bryant published the poem "The Massacre at Scio" in 1824.

During a session of the Permanent Holy Synod of the Orthodox Church of Greece in Athens on 14–15 July 2021, at the proposal of Metropolitan Markos of Chios, Psara and Oinousses, the Holy Synod glorified Metropolitan Plato of Chios, and 43 others, who were martyred by Ottoman troops in the Chios Massacre on Holy Friday in 1822. The list included priests, deacons, hieromonks and monks, to be commemorated on the Sunday of the Paralytic each year.

== Greek response ==
After the Chios massacre, the Greek revolutionary government managed to gather a significant amount of money in order to outfit its ships and attack the Ottoman fleet.

At the end of May, the Greek captains from Psara and Hydra decided to burn the Ottoman flagship, the 84-gun ship of the line Mansur al-liwa, by using fire ships. The operation took place on the night of 18 June [O.S. 6 June] 1822 and was conducted by Konstantinos Kanaris and Andreas Pipinos. About two thousand Ottoman sailors were killed or drowned, including admiral Nasuhzade Ali Pasha, who had led the Chios massacre two months earlier.

== Classification as genocide ==
Some historians, genocide scholars, and other academics classify the Chios massacre as a genocide.

Raphael Lemkin, who coined the term "genocide", included the massacre of Chios as a chapter in his planned three-volume History of Genocide. Historian Steven L. Jacobs agrees with Lemkin's assessment that the massacre constituted genocide.

Turkish historian H. Şükrü Ilıcak wrote that the massacre was "only an iota shy of what might nowadays be labeled genocide". Academic Colette Burton calls it the "Chiot genocide" and notes the brutality which caused "the death, enslavement, and forced emigration of four-fifths of the population". Art historian Gilles Néret also calls it a genocide practiced by the Sublime Porte against Greeks.

Genocide scholar Hannibal Travis writes that the massacre has been described as "a genocidal attack on an entire community". Political scientist Eleni Tseligka calls the Chios massacre "the first notable incident of Christian genocide and ethnic cleansing in the Ottoman Empire", in the context of "One Hundred Years of Bloodshed" between 1822 and 1922.

== Gallery ==
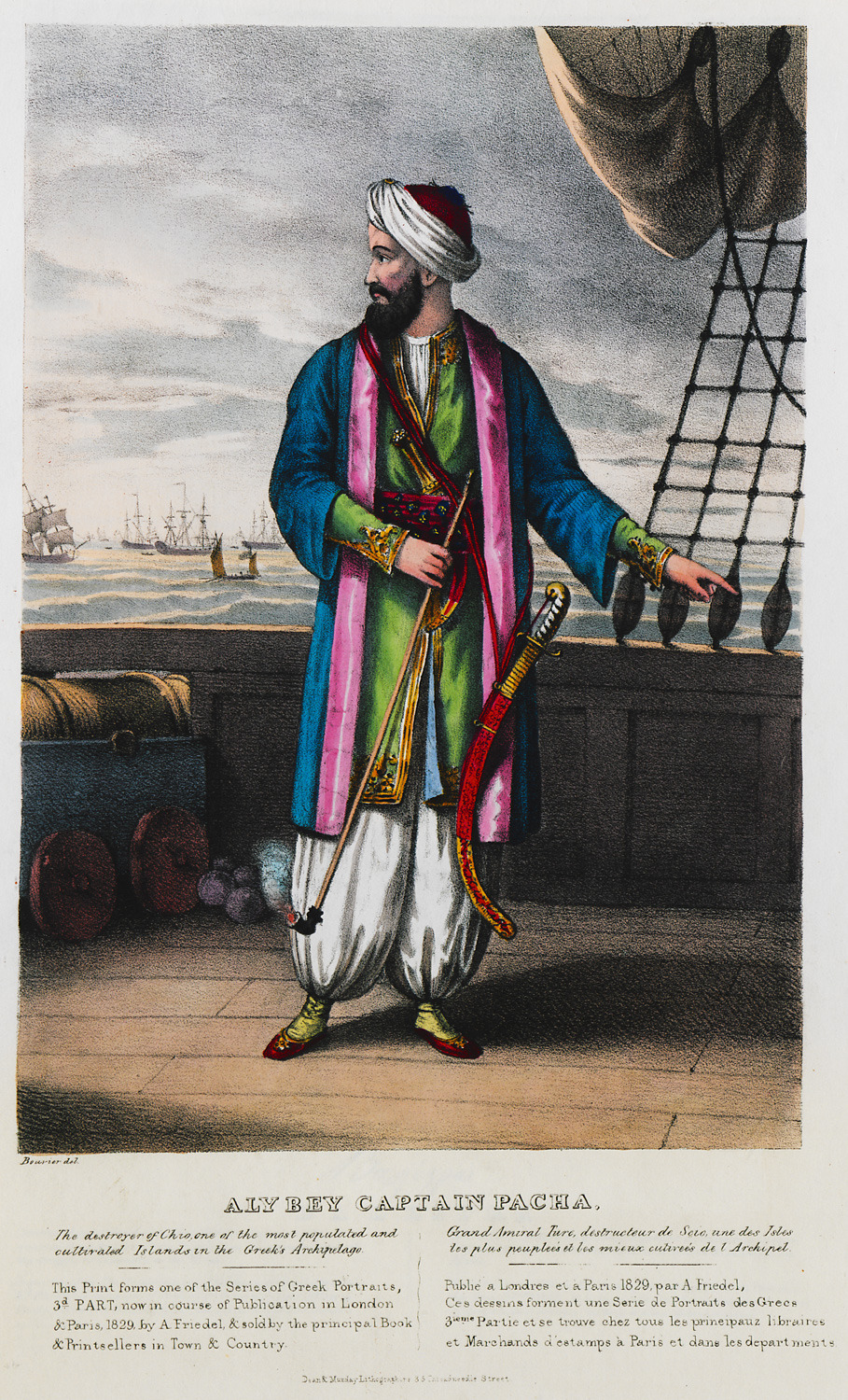
Ottoman admiral Nasuhzade Ali Pasha, who led the Chios massacre.

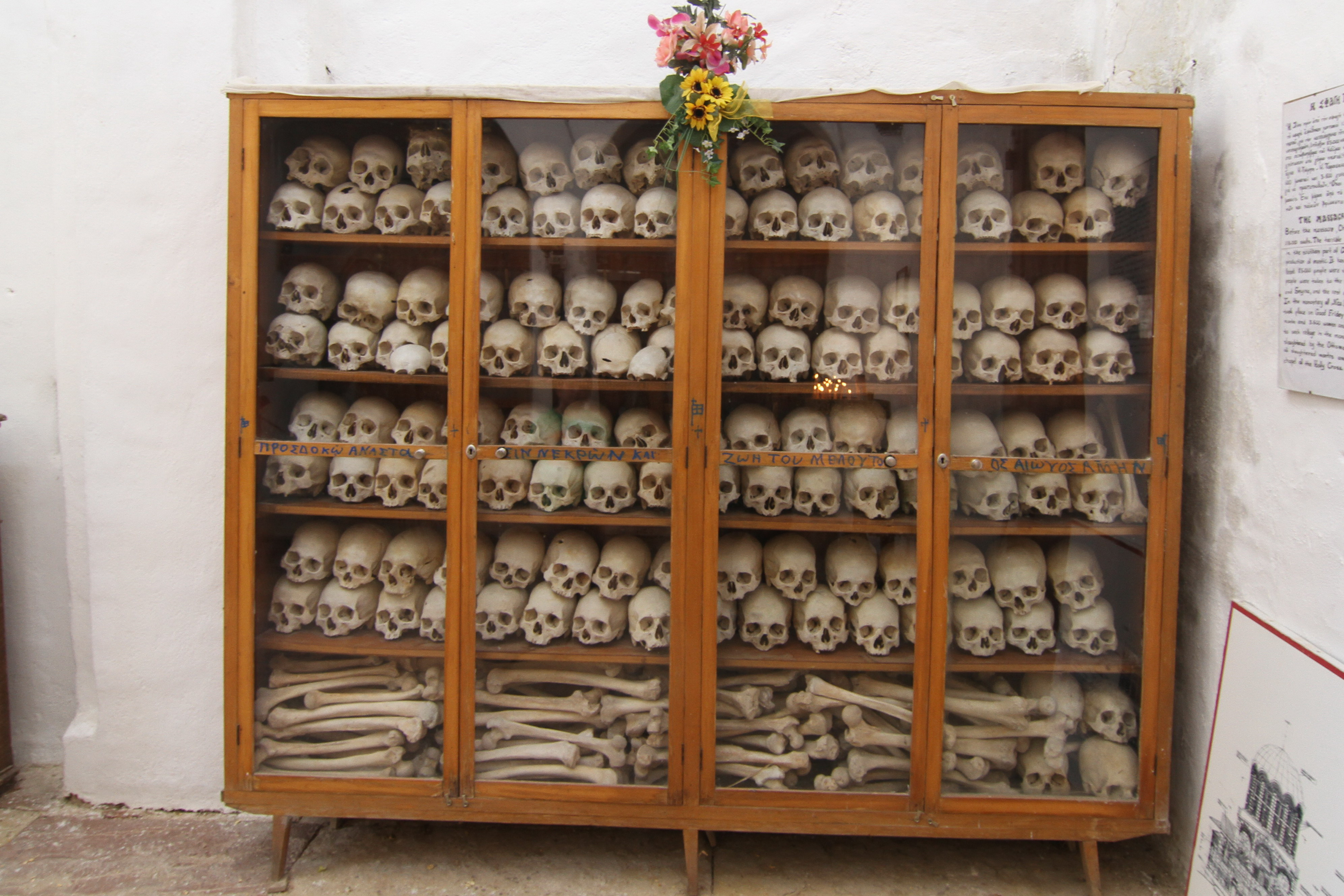
Human skeletal remains of the massacre in Nea Moni of Chios.

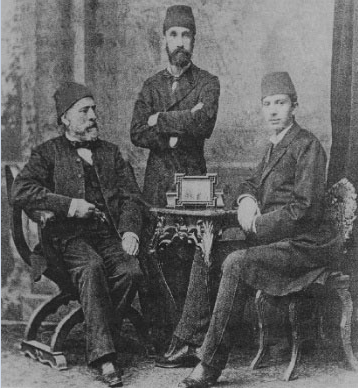
Ibrahim Edhem from the Skaramanga family and sons.

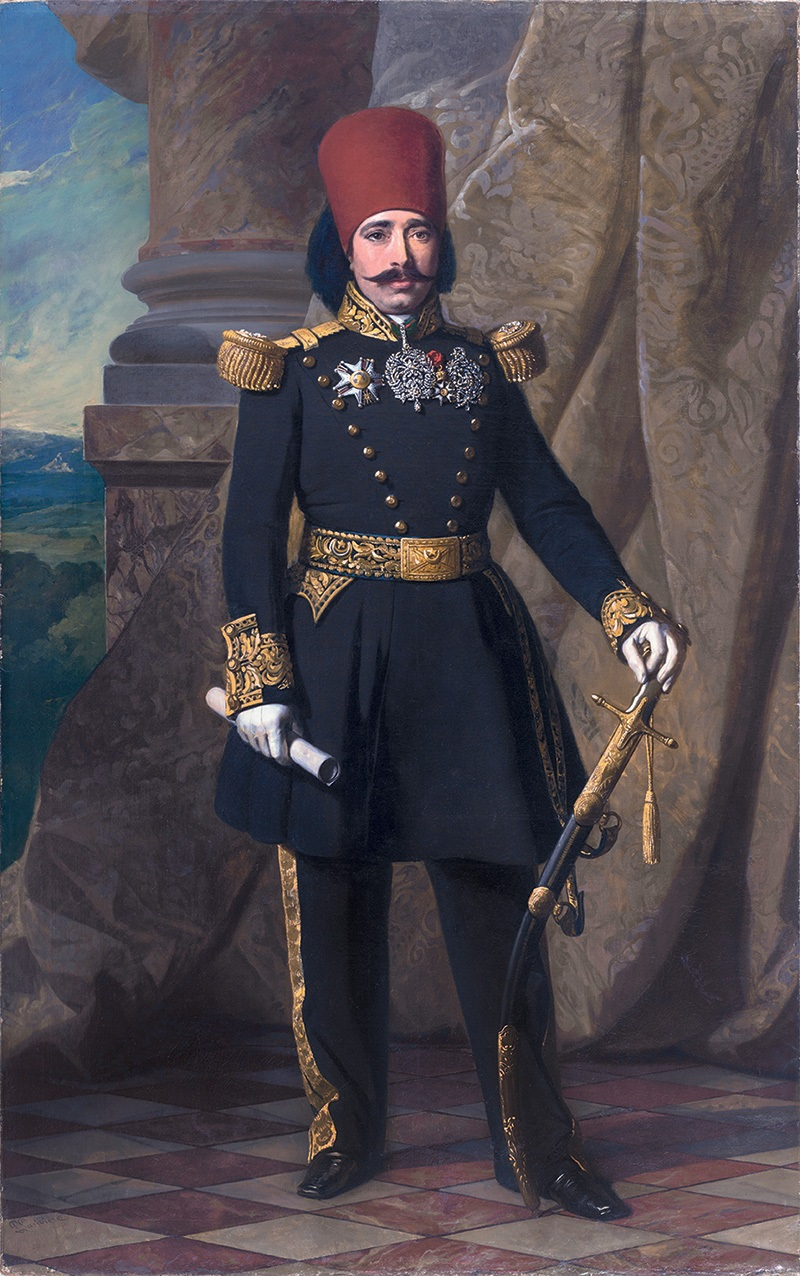
Georgios Stravelakis, a survivor at the age of five of the massacre, was sold into slavery. He eventually became Prime Minister of Tunis, from 1837 to 1873.

== See also ==
- Constantinople massacre of 1821
- List of massacres in Greece
- Massacres during the Greek Revolution
- Navarino massacre
- Tripolitsa massacre
- Destruction of Psara
- Chios expedition
- Ottoman wars in Europe
- Firman of 1830
