= Burning of the Ottoman flagship off Chios =

1822 battle of the Greek War of Independence

- Part of the Greek War of Independence
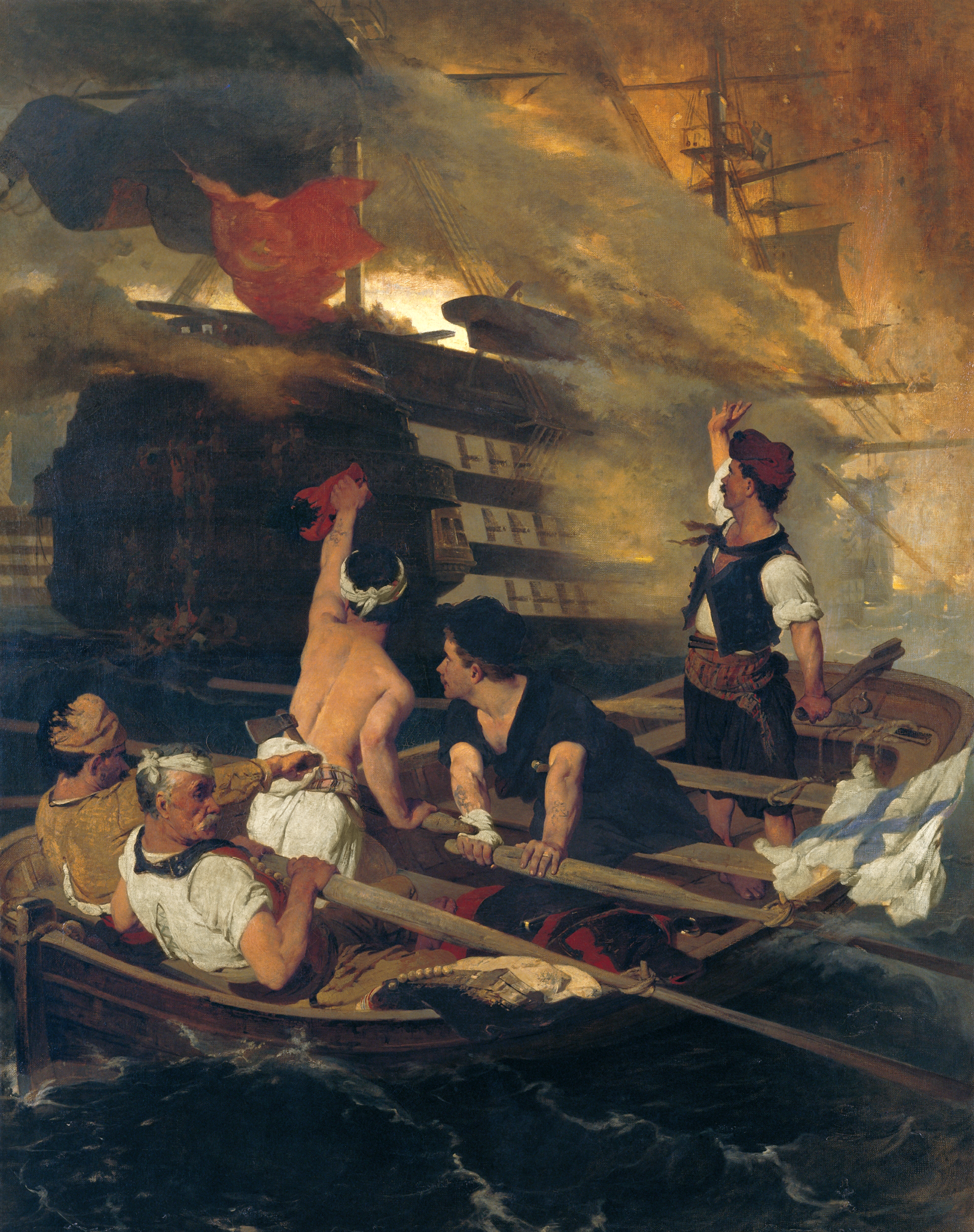
- The burning of the Turkish flagship by Kanaris; Nikiforos Lytras, c. 1873
Date	18 June 1822
Location	Chios, Eyalet of the Archipelago 38°22′39″N 26°03′54″E
Result	Greek victory

Belligerents
First Hellenic Republic	Ottoman Empire

Commanders and leaders
Konstantinos Kanaris; Andreas Pipinos	Nasuhzade Ali Pasha †

Strength
2 fire ships	2 ships of the line

Casualties and losses
Unknown	c. 2,000 killed 1 ship of the line destroyed

The burning of the Ottoman flagship off Chios took place on the night of 18 June 1822. The event, occurring during the Greek War of Independence, was done in reprisal for the Chios massacre which occurred two months earlier. Two Greek fire ships set fire to Mansur al-liwa, an 84-gun Ottoman ship of the line, which subsequently blew up. Approximately 2,000 Ottoman Navy personnel were killed, among them Kapudan Pasha Nasuhzade Ali Pasha.

== The event ==
In March 1821, the Greek War of Independence began against the Ottoman Empire. One year later, the Ottoman forces disembarked on the island of Chios, massacred more than 30,000 Greek inhabitants, and captured about 50,000 who were sold as slaves in Smyrna and Istanbul.

After the Chios massacre, the Greek revolutionary government managed to gather a significant amount of money (342,000 kuruş) in order to outfit its ships and attack the armada. In May 1821, the Greek navy made consecutive attacks against the Ottoman fleet.

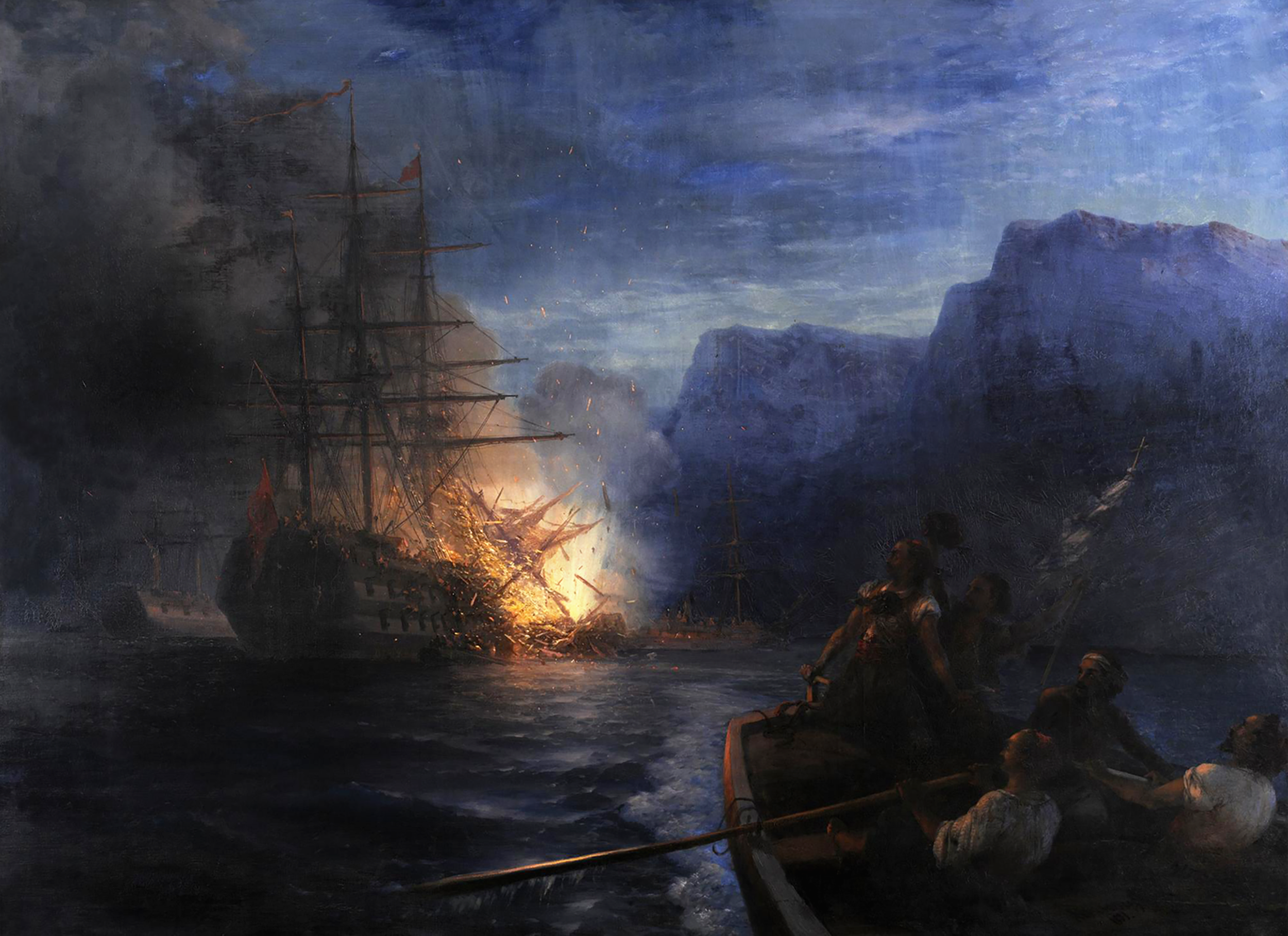
The burning of the Turkish flagship by Kanaris. Painting by Ivan Aivazovsky, 1881

At the end of May, the Greek captains from Psara and Hydra decided to burn the Ottoman flagship by using fire ships. Konstantinos Kanaris and Andreas Pipinos took charge of the operation. The first would blow up the Ottoman flagship with his fireboat and the second the vice admiral's flagship. The two fireboats would be accompanied by four ships that would gather the sailors of the fireboats after the completion of the operation.

The operation took place on the night of 18 June [O.S. 6 June] 1822, when the winds were advantageous, the night was dark and the Ottomans were celebrating the Ramadan Bayram. Andreas Pipinos tried to burn the rear admiral's flagship, but although some damage was caused, it did not sink, as the crew realized the danger quickly and saw off the fireboat. However, Kanaris managed to affix his fireship firmly to the flagship, the 84-gun ship of the line Mansur al-liwa. The fire spread to the Ottoman ship and eventually reached the gunpowder hold, resulting in an explosion which destroyed the ship. About two thousand sailors were killed or drowned, including the admiral of the Ottoman navy, Nasuhzade Ali Pasha, who was killed by a falling spar.

According to Thomas Gordon, the burning of the Ottoman flagship in Chios was one of the most astonishing achievements in history and he declared Konstantinos Kanaris a hero that Greece could be proud of.

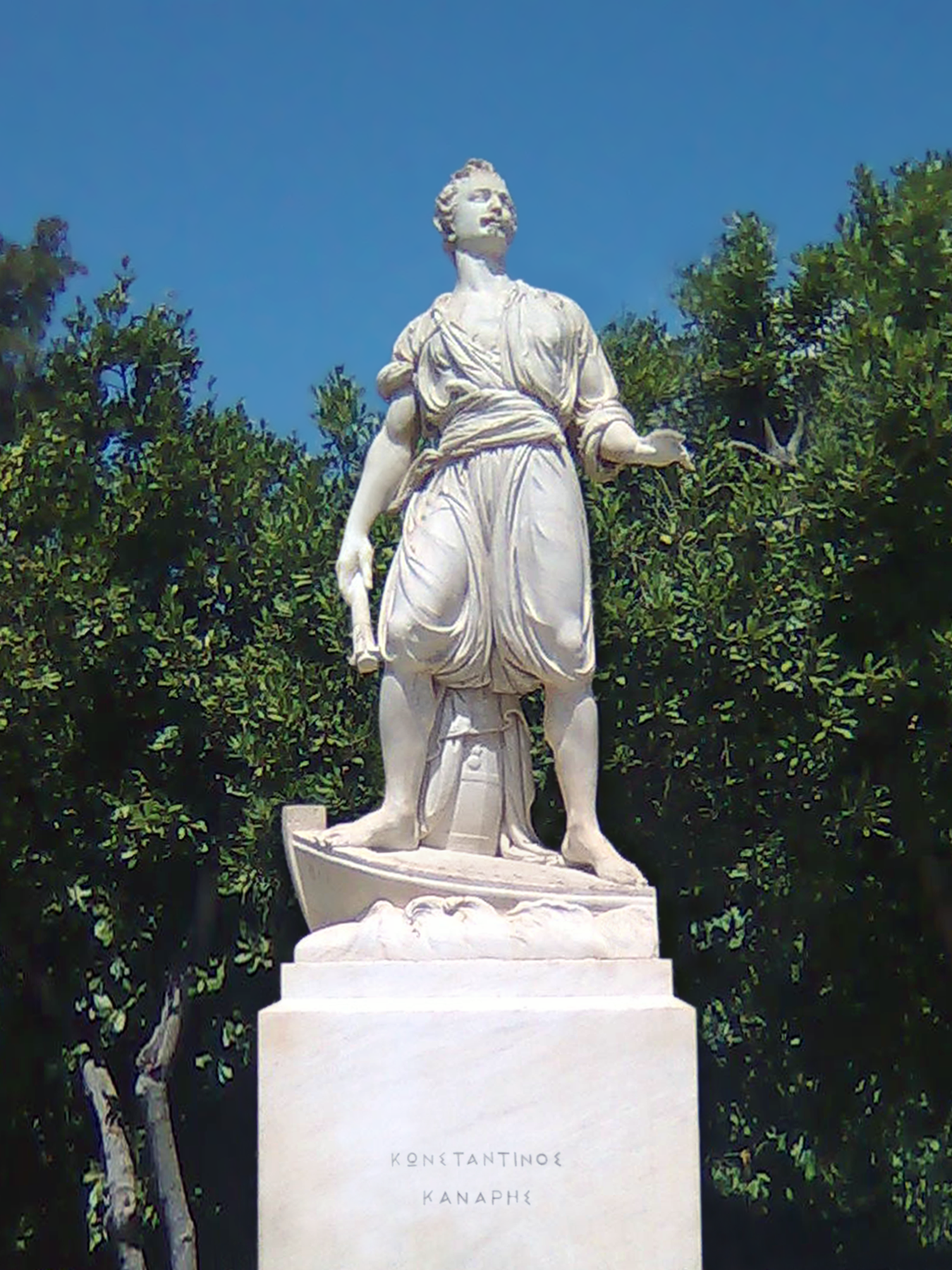
Konstantinos Kanaris

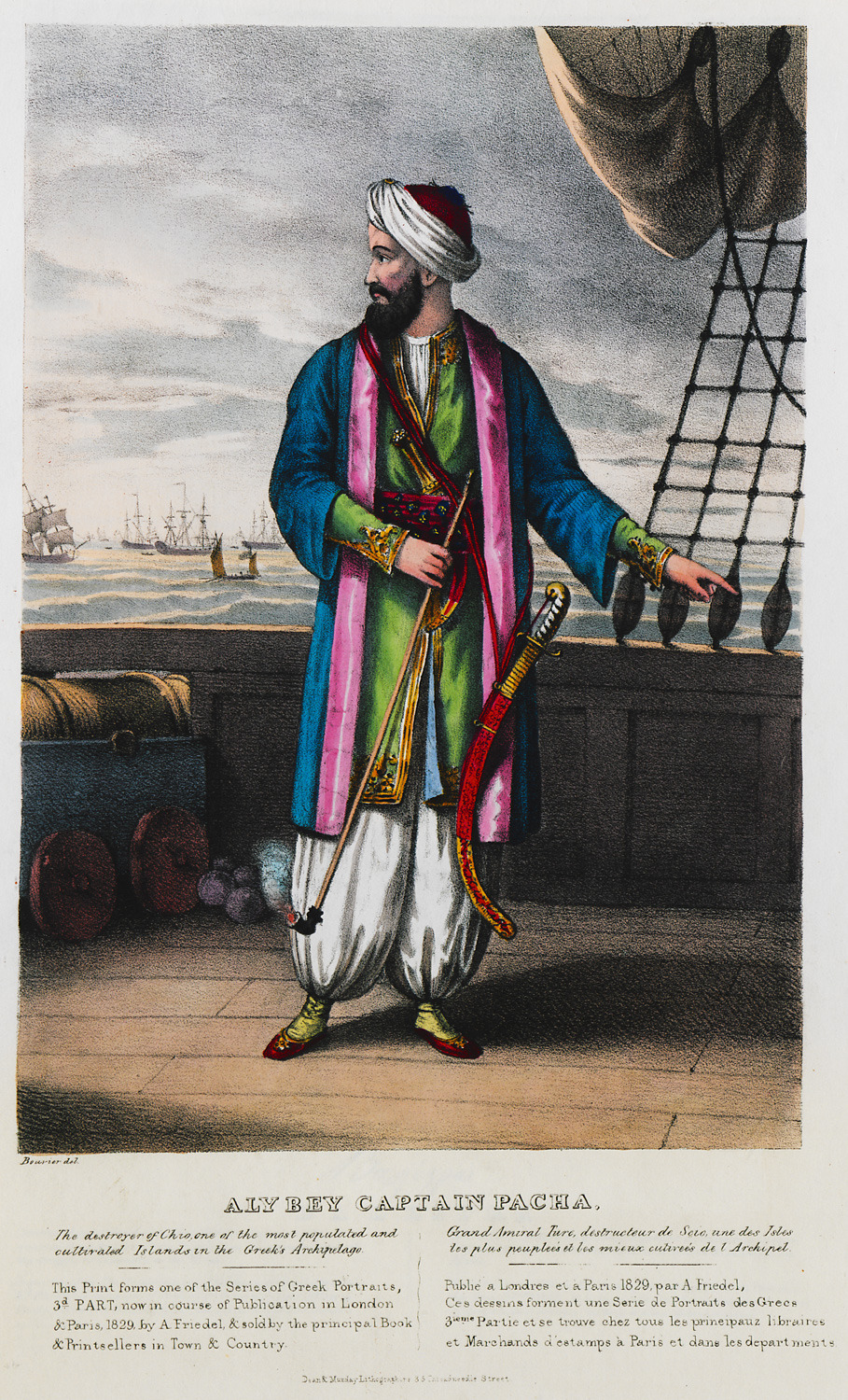
Nasuhzade Ali Pasha

== See also ==
- Greek War of Independence
- Kanaris at Chios (sculpture)
- Chios massacre
- Destruction of Psara

== Sources ==
- Anderson, R. C. (1952). Naval Wars in the Levant 1559–1853. Princeton: Princeton University Press.
- Finlay, George (1861). History of the Greek Revolution, Vol. I. Edinburgh and London: William Blackwood and Sons.
- Sfyroeras, Vasileios (1975). "Σταθεροποίηση της Επαναστάσεως 1822-1823" [Stabilization of the Revolution 1822-1823]. In Christopoulos, Georgios A. & Bastias, Ioannis K. (eds.). Ιστορία του Ελληνικού Έθνους [History of the Greek Nation] (in Greek). Vol. ΙΒ: Η Ελληνική Επανάσταση (1821 - 1832) [The Greek Revolution (1821 - 1832)]. Athens: Ekdotiki Athinon. pp. 212–286. ISBN 978-960-213-108-4.
- Vakalopoulos, Apostolos E. (1982). Ιστορία του νέου ελληνισμού, Τόμος ΣΤ′: Η Μεγάλη Ελληνική Επανάσταση (1821–1829) - Η εσωτερική κρίση (1822–1825) [History of modern Hellenism, Volume VI: The Great Greek Revolution (1821–1829) - Internal Crisis (1822–1825)] (in Greek). Thessaloniki.
