= Andreas Pipinos =

Greek naval officer (1788–1836)

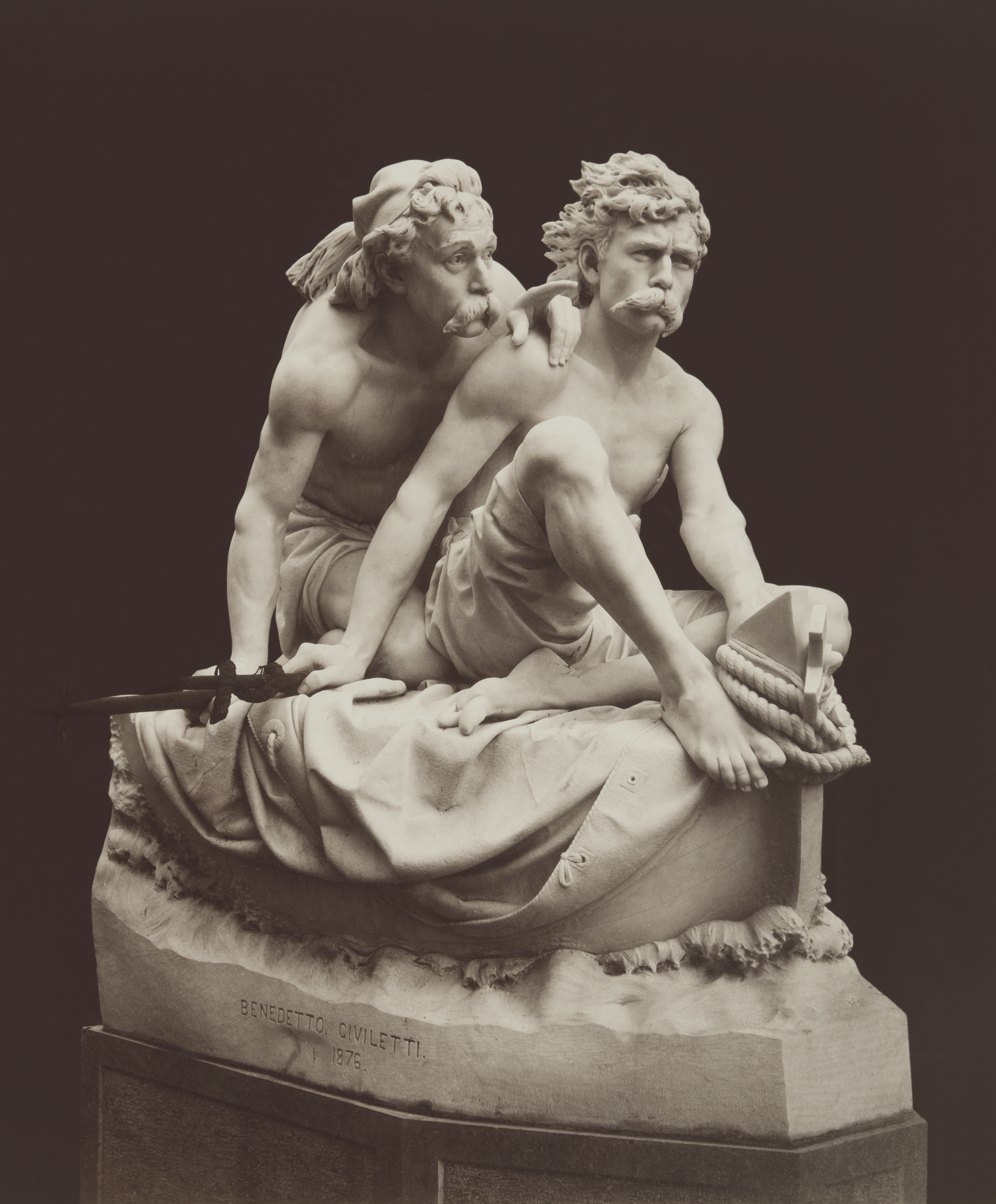
- Konstantinos Kanaris (in front) and Andreas Pipinos (behind) sailing towards the Ottoman fleet by Benedetto Civiletti
- Born: 12 March 1788; Hydra, Ottoman Empire (now Greece)
- Died: 14 December 1836 (aged 48) Athens, Kingdom of Greece
- Allegiance: (Greece) First Hellenic Republic; Kingdom of Greece
- Branch: Hellenic Navy
- Conflicts: Greek War of Independence: Burning of the Ottoman flagship off Chios; Battle of Nauplia; Battle of Gerontas

Andreas Pipinos (Greek: Ανδρέας Πιπίνος; 12 March 1788 – 14 December 1836) was a Greek military officer during the Greek War of Independence.

== Biography ==
Pipinos was born on 12 March 1788, on the Greek island of Hydra (then part of the Ottoman Empire). In March 1821, the Greek War of Independence began against the Ottoman Empire. The following year, the Ottoman forces disembarked on the island of Chios, massacred more than 30,000 Greek inhabitants, and captured about 50,000 who were sold as slaves in İzmir and Istanbul.

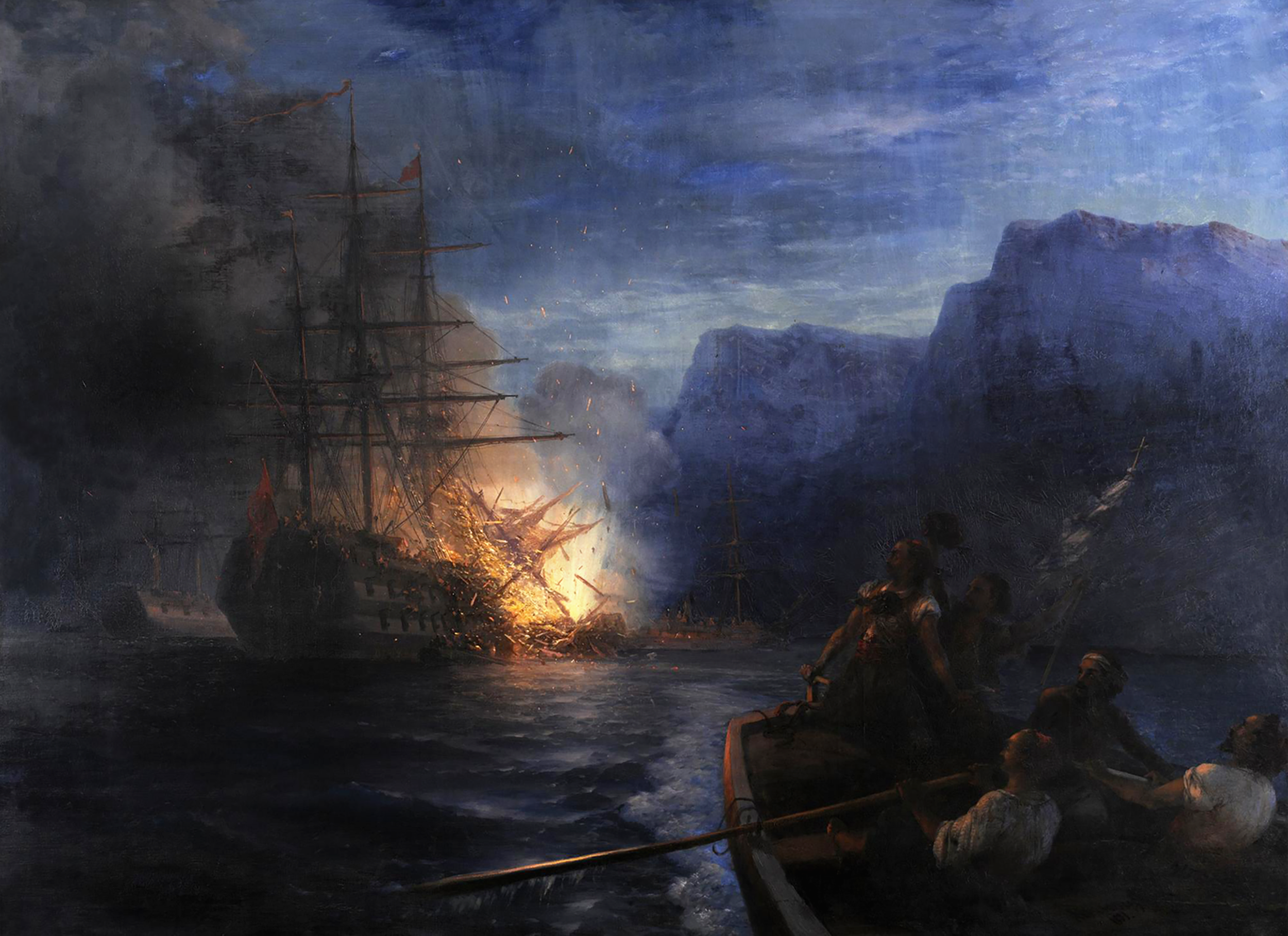
Painting by Ivan Aivazovsky of the burning of the Ottoman flagship off Chios on the night of 18 June 1822

After the Chios massacre, the Greek revolutionary government managed to gather a significant amount of money (342,000 kuruş) in order to outfit its ships and attack the Ottoman fleet. At the end of May, the Greek captains from Psara and Hydra decided to burn the Ottoman flagship by using fire ships. Konstantinos Kanaris and Pipinos took charge of the operation. The first would blow up the Ottoman flagship with his fireboat and the second the vice admiral's flagship. The two fire ships would be accompanied by four Greek vessels that would gather the sailors of the fireboats after the completion of the operation.

The operation took place on the night of 18 June [O.S. 6 June] 1822, when the winds were advantageous, the night was dark and the Ottomans were celebrating the Ramadan Bayram. Pipinos tried to burn the rear admiral's flagship, but although some damage was caused, it did not sink, as the crew realized the danger quickly and saw off the fire ship. However, Kanaris managed to affix his fireboat firmly to the flagship, the 84-gun ship of the line Mansur al-liwa. The fire spread to the Ottoman ship and eventually reached the gunpowder hold, resulting in an explosion which destroyed the ship. About two thousand sailors were killed or drowned, including the admiral of the Ottoman navy, Nasuhzade Ali Pasha, who was killed by a falling spar.

== Sources ==
- Anderson, R. C. (1952). Naval Wars in the Levant 1559–1853. Princeton: Princeton University Press.
- Sfyroeras, Vasileios (1975). "Σταθεροποίηση της Επαναστάσεως 1822-1823" [Stabilization of the Revolution 1822-1823]. In Christopoulos, Georgios A. & Bastias, Ioannis K. (eds.). Ιστορία του Ελληνικού Έθνους [History of the Greek Nation] (in Greek). Vol. ΙΒ: Η Ελληνική Επανάσταση (1821 - 1832) [The Greek Revolution (1821 - 1832)]. Athens: Ekdotiki Athinon. pp. 212–286. ISBN 978-960-213-108-4.
