= Siege of Navarino =

Siege of Navarino may refer to:

- Siege of Navarino (1572), between the Ottoman Empire and the Holy League
- Siege of Navarino (1821), which resulted in the Navarino massacre during the Greek War of Independence
