= Massacres in the Greek War of Independence =

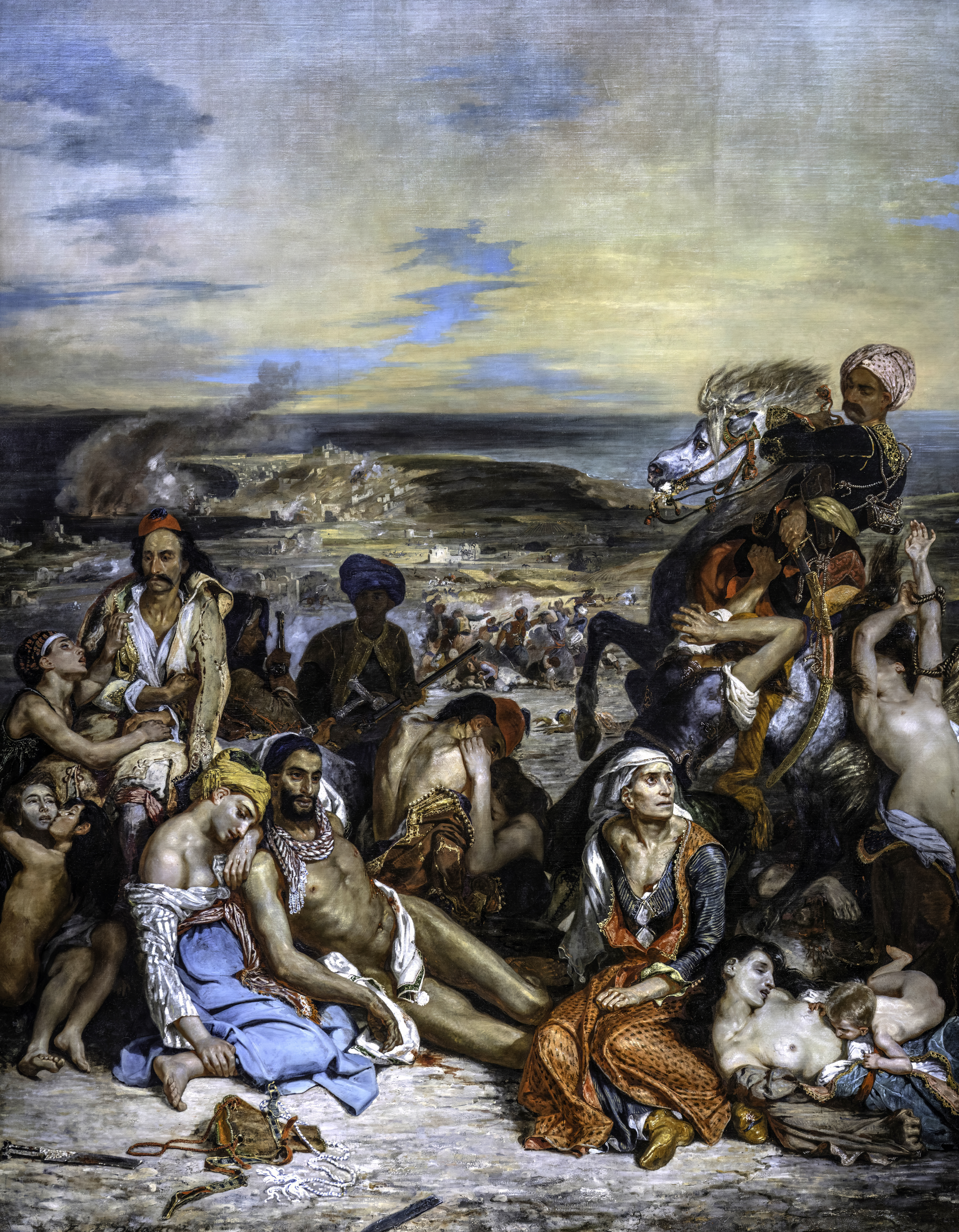
Eugène Delacroix's Massacre of Chios

There were numerous massacres during the Greek War of Independence (1821–1829) perpetrated by both the Ottoman forces and the Greek revolutionaries. The war was characterized by a lack of respect for civilian life, and prisoners of war on both sides of the conflict. Massacres of Greeks took place especially in Ionia, Crete, Constantinople, Macedonia and the Aegean islands. Muslim (including Albanian, Islamized Greek, ethnic Turkish and Romani) and Jewish populations, who were identified with the Ottomans inhabiting the Peloponnese, suffered massacres, particularly where Greek forces were dominant.

Greek communities in the Aegean Sea, Crete, Central and Southern Greece were wiped out, while Muslim and smaller Jewish communities in the Peloponnese were also destroyed. In total, it is estimated that 230,000–600,000 Greek civilians and 15,000–25,000 Muslim civilians lost their lives as a result of the war. The first massacre of the war was the Constantinople massacre, while the largest was the massacre of Chios, both against Greeks.

== Massacres of Greeks ==
=== Constantinople ===
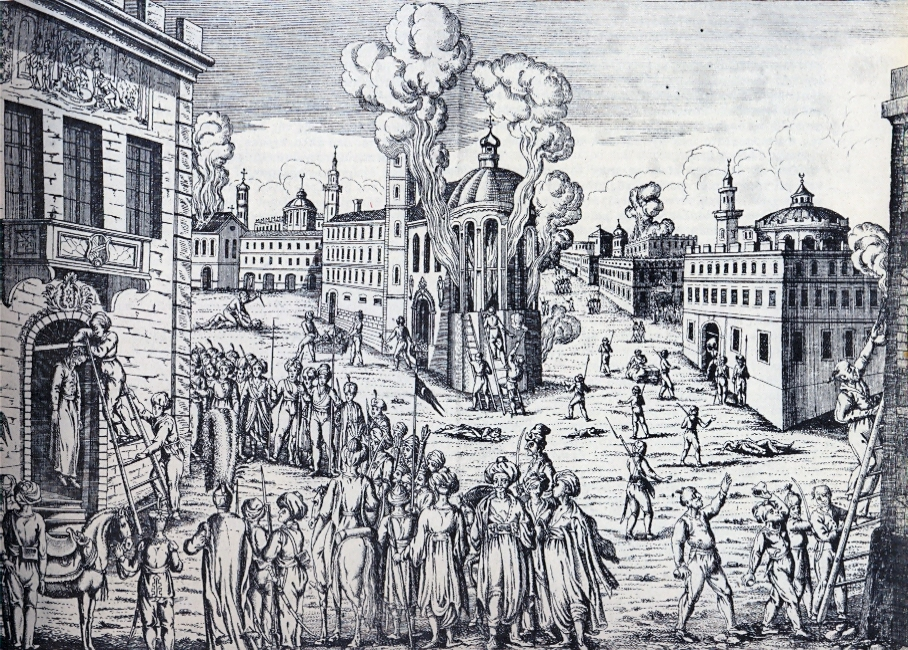
Atrocities against the Greek population of Constantinople, April 1821.

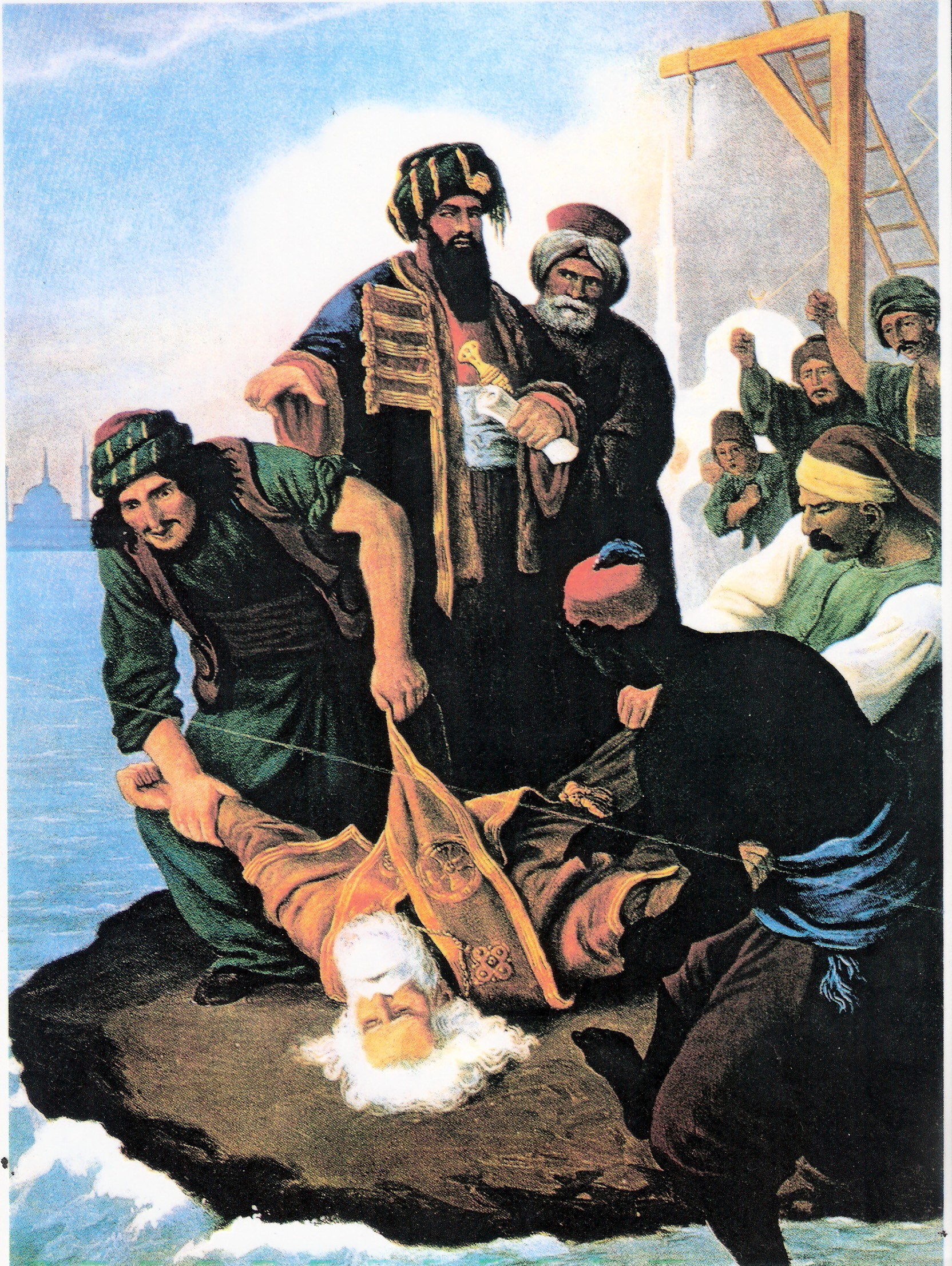
Execution of Patriarch Gregory V of Constantinople

Most of the Greeks in the Greek quarter of Constantinople were massacred. On Easter Sunday, 9 April 1821, Gregory V was hanged in the central outside portal of the Ecumenical Patriarchate by the Ottomans. His body was mutilated and thrown into the sea, where it was rescued by Greek sailors. One week later, the former Ecumenical Patriarch Cyril VI was hanged in the gate of the Adrianople's cathedral. This was followed by the execution of two Metropolitans and twelve Bishops by the Turkish authorities. By the end of April, a number of prominent Greeks had been decapitated by Turkish forces in Constantinople, including Constantine Mourousis, Levidis Tsalikis, Dimitrios Paparigopoulos, Antonios Tsouras, and the Phanariotes Petros Tsigris, Dimitrios Skanavis and Manuel Hotzeris, while Georgios Mavrocordatos was hanged. In May, the Metropolitans Gregorios of Derkon, Dorotheos of Adrianople, Ioannikios of Tyrnavos, Joseph of Thessaloniki, and the Phanariote Georgios Callimachi and Nikolaos Mourousis were decapitated on the Sultan's orders in Constantinople.

=== Aegean Islands ===
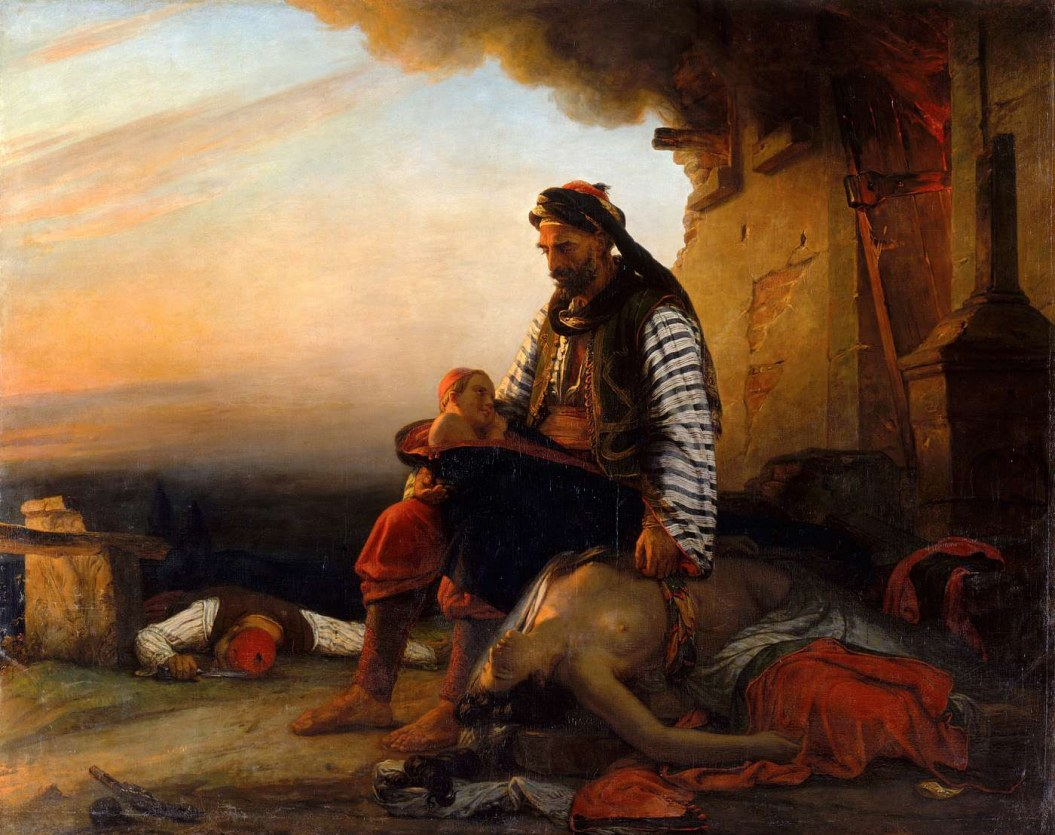
"Holocaust of Samothraki" (1821) by François-Auguste Vinson

The Turks and Egyptians ravaged several Greek islands during the Greek Revolution, including those of Samothrace (1821), Chios (1822), Kos, Rhodes, Kasos and Psara (1824). The massacre of Samothrace occurred on September 1, 1821, where a Turkish fleet under the Kapudan Pasha Nasuhzade Ali Pasha killed most of the male population, took the women and children to slavery and burned down their homes. The Chios Massacre of 1822 became one of the most notorious occurrences of the war. It is estimated that up to 100,000 Chiots were killed or enslaved during the massacre, while 20,000 escaped as refugees. Mehmet Ali, the Pasha of Egypt, dispatched his fleet to Kasos and on May 27, 1824 killed the population. A few weeks later, Koca Hüsrev Mehmed Pasha's fleet massacred the population of Psara.

=== Central Greece ===
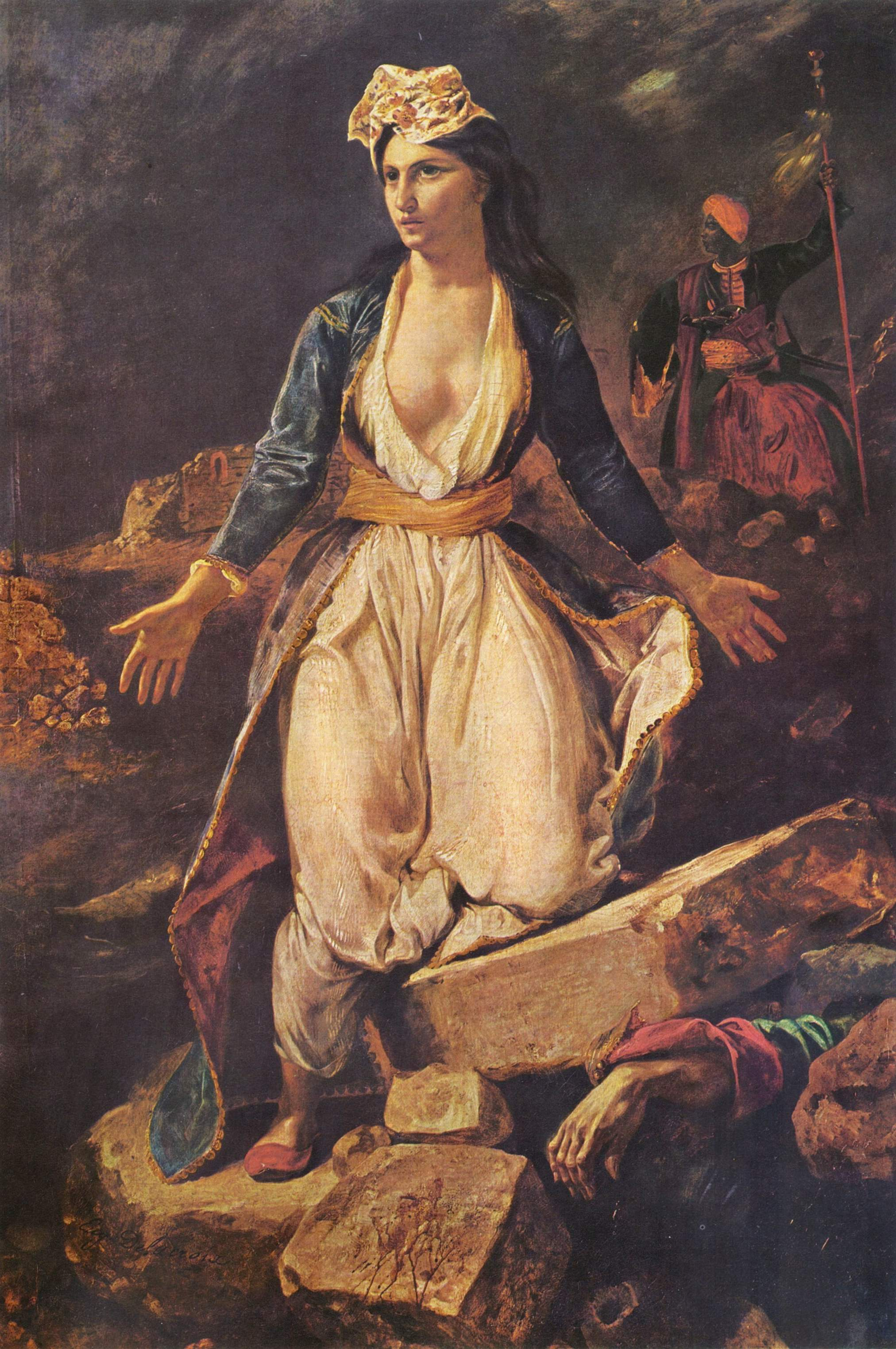
Greece Expiring on the Ruins of Missolonghi (1827, Musée des Beaux-Arts, Bordeaux)

Shortly after Lord Byron's death in 1824, the Turks arrived to besiege the Greeks once more at Missolonghi. Turkish commander Reşid Mehmed Pasha was joined by Ibrahim Pasha, who crossed the Gulf of Corinth, and during the early part of 1826, Ibrahim had more artillery and supply brought in. However, his men were unable to storm the walls, and in 1826, following a one-year siege, Turkish-Egyptian forces conquered the city on Palm Sunday, and exterminated almost its entire population. The attack increased support for the Greek cause in western Europe, with Eugène Delacroix depicting the massacre in his painting Greece Expiring on the Ruins of Missolonghi.

=== Crete ===
During the great massacre of Heraklion on 24 June 1821, remembered in the area as "the great ravage" ("ο μεγάλος αρπεντές", "o megalos arpentes"), the Turks also killed the metropolite of Crete, Gerasimos Pardalis, and five more bishops: Neofitos of Knossos, Joachim of Herronissos, Ierotheos of Lambis, Zacharias of Sitia and Kallinikos, the titular bishop of Diopolis.

After the Sultan's vassal in Egypt was sent to intervene with the Egyptian fleet on 1825, Muhammad Ali's son, Ibrahim, landed in Crete and began to massacre the majority Greek community.

=== Cyprus ===
In July 1821, the head of the Cypriot Orthodox Church Archbishop Kyprianos, along with 486 prominent Greek Cypriots, amongst them the Metropolitans Chrysanthethos of Paphos, Meletios of Kition and Lavrentios of Kyrenia, were executed by hanging or beheading by the Ottomans in Nicosia. St. Clair writes:

In Cyprus, which had enjoyed good community relations, there were at first only isolated murders, until the Pashas of Aleppo and Acre were ordered to send troops to secure the island. When their Syrian troops landed, law and order broke down. Nicosia and Famagusta were sacked and the island was given over to killing and pillage. The local Turks joined in. The archbishop, five bishops, and thirty-six other priests were put to death.

The French consul M. Méchain reported on 15 September 1821 that the local pasha, Küçük Mehmet, carried out several days of massacres in Cyprus since July 9 and continued on for forty days, despite the Vizier's command to end the plundering since 20 July 1821. On October 15, a massive Turkish Cypriot mob seized and hanged an archbishop, five bishops, thirty-six ecclesiastics, and hanged most of the Greek Cypriots in Larnaca and the other towns. By September and October 1822, sixty-two Greek Cypriot villages and hamlets had entirely disappeared and many people, including clerics, were massacred.

=== Peloponnese ===
Historian David Brewer writes that in the first year of the revolution, a Turkish army descended on the city of Patras and slaughtered all of the civilians of the settlement, razing the city. The forces of Ibrahim Pasha were extremely brutal in the Peloponnese, burning the major port of Kalamata to the ground and slaughtering the city's inhabitants; they also ravaged the countryside and were heavily involved in the slave trade.

=== Macedonia ===
Greek villages in Macedonia were destroyed, and many of the inhabitants were put to death. Thomas Gordon reports executions of Greek civilians in Serres and Thessaloniki, beheadings of merchants and clergy, and seventy burnt villages.

In May 1821, the governor Yusuf Bey ordered his men to kill any Greeks in Thessaloniki they found in the streets. Haïroullah Effendi reported that then and "for days and nights the air was filled with shouts, wails, screams." The Metropolitan bishop was brought in chains, together with other leading notables, and they were tortured and executed in the square of the flour market. Some were hanged from the plane trees around the Rotonda. Others were killed in the cathedral where they had fled for refuge, and their heads were gathered together as a present for Yusuf Bey.

In 1822, Abdul Abud, the Pasha of Thessaloniki, arrived on 14 March at the head of a 16,000 strong force and 12 cannons against Naousa. The Greeks defended Naousa with a force of 4,000 under the overall command of Zafeirakis Theodosiou and Anastasios Karatasos. The Turks attempted to take the town on 16 March 1822, and on 18 and 19 March, without success. On 24 March the Turks began a bombardment of the city walls that lasted for days. After requests for the town's surrender were dismissed by the Greeks, the Turks charged the gate of St George on 31 March. The Turkish attack failed but on 6 April, after receiving fresh reinforcements of some 3,000 men, the Turkish army finally overcame the Greek resistance and entered the city. In an infamous incident, many of the women committed suicide by falling down a cliff over the small river Arapitsa. Abdul Abud laid the town and surrounding area to waste. The Greek population was massacred. The destruction of Naoussa marked the end of the Greek revolution in Macedonia in 1822.

=== Anatolia ===
The Greek inhabitants of Smyrna and Kydonies suffered from massacres in the hands of the local Turks and the Ottoman authorities. According to St. Clair: "The town [of Kydonies] was burned to the ground and thousands of Greeks were massacred. The survivors, mostly women and children, were rounded up and sent to the slave markets at Smyrna and Constantinople". Regarding Smyrna, he wrote:

The city mob was joined by hordes of Turks from the interior who had banded together with the declared intention of marching to the scene of the revolt. Turkish troops stationed outside disobeyed their officers and entered the city. For a while the authorities attempted to keep control and, apart from sporadic murders and riots, some form of order was maintained. But when news arrived of the sinking of a Turkish ship, the situation got out of hand. The local Turkish magistrates were called on by the mob to sign a document authorizing the extermination of the Christians. When they refused they were themselves murdered. Three thousand armed Turks entered the Greek quarter and sated their lust for revenge on the defenceless populace.

== Massacres of Turks, Albanians and other Muslims ==
=== Peloponnese ===
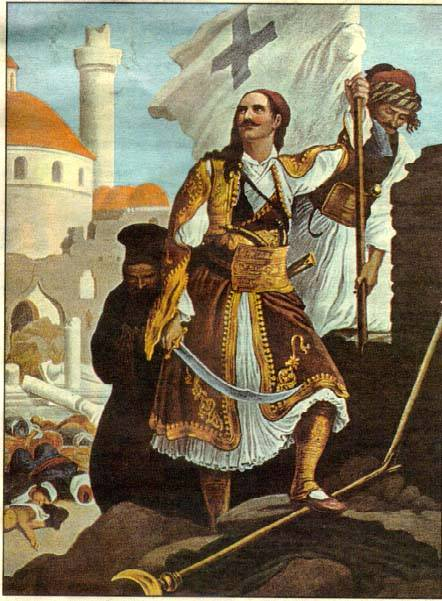
Siege of Tripolitsa

According to historian William St. Clair, during the beginning of the Greek revolution upwards of twenty thousand Turkish men, women and children were killed by their Greek neighbors in a few weeks of slaughter. William St. Clair also argued that: "with the beginning of the revolt, the bishops and priests exhorted their parishioners to exterminate infidel Muslims." St. Clair wrote:

The Turks of Greece left few traces. They disappeared suddenly and finally in the spring of 1821 unmourned and unnoticed by the rest of the world ... It was hard to believe then that Greece once contained a large population of Turkish descent, living in small communities all over the country, prosperous farmers, merchants, and officials, whose families had known no other home for hundreds of years ... They were killed deliberately, without qualm or scruple, and there was no regrets either then or later.

Atrocities toward the Turkish civilian population inhabiting the Peloponnese had started in Achaia on 28 March, just with the beginning of the Greek revolt. On 2 April, the outbreak became general over the whole of Peloponnese and on that day many Turks were murdered in different places. On the third of April 1821, the Turks of Kalavryta surrendered upon promises of security which were afterwards violated. Followingly, massacres ensued against the Turkish civilians in the towns of Peloponnese that the Greek revolutionaries had captured.

The Turks in Monemvasia, weakened by the famine opened the gates of the city, and laid down their weapons. Six hundred of them had already gone on board the brigs, when the Maniots burst into the town and started murdering all those who had not yet reached to the shore or those who had chosen to stay in the town. Those on the ships meanwhile were stripped of their clothes, beaten and left on a desolate rock in the Aegean, instead of being deported to Asia Minor as promised. Only a few of them were saved by a French merchant, called M. Bonfort.

A general massacre ensued the fall of Navarino on August 19, 1821. See Navarino Massacre.

The worst Greek atrocity in terms of the numbers of victims involved was the massacre following the Fall of Tripolitsa in 1821:

For three days the miserable inhabitants were given over to lust and cruelty of a mob of savages. Neither sex nor age was spared. Women and children were tortured before being put to death. So great was the slaughter that Kolokotronis himself says that, from the gate to the citadel his horse's hoofs never touched the ground. His path of triumph was carpeted with corpses. At the end of two days, the wretched remnant of the Mussulmans were deliberately collected, to the number of some two thousand souls, of every age and sex, but principally women and children, were led out to a ravine in the neighboring mountains and there butchered like cattle.

Although the total estimates of the casualties vary, the Turkish, Muslim Albanian and Jewish population of the Peloponnese had ceased to exist as a settled community. Some estimates of the Turkish and Muslim Albanian civilian deaths by the rebels range from 6,000 to 15,000 Muslim residents (out of the town's 40,000). Massacres of Turkish civilians started simultaneously with the outbreak of the revolt.

Historian George Finlay claimed that the extermination of the Muslims in the rural districts was the result of a premeditated design and it proceeded more from the suggestions of men of letters, than from the revengeful feelings of the people. Mary Shelley wrote of the massacres in a letter to Maria Gisborne: "Our friends in Greece are getting on famously. All the Morea is subdued, and much treasure was acquired with the capture of Tripoliza. Some cruelties have ensued. But the oppressor must in the end buy tyranny with blood – such is the law of necessity".

=== Central Greece ===
In Athens, 1,150 Turks, of whom only 180 were capable of bearing arms, surrendered upon promises of security. W. Alison Phillips noted that: "A scene of horror followed which has only too many parallels during the course of this horrible war."

Vrachori, modern-day Agrinio, was an important town in West-Central Greece. It contained, besides the Christian population, some five hundred Muslim families and about two hundred Jews. The massacres in Vrachori commenced with the Jews, and soon Muslims shared the same fate.

=== Aegean Islands ===
There were also massacres towards the Muslim inhabitants of the islands in the Aegean Sea, in the early years of the Greek revolt. According to historian William St. Clair, one of the aims of the Greek revolutionaries was to embroil as many Greek communities as possible in their struggle. Their technique was "to engineer some atrocity against the local Turkish population", so that these different Greek communities would have to ally themselves with the revolutionaries fearing a retaliation from the Ottomans. In such a case, in March 1821, Greeks from Samos island had landed in the Chios and attacked the Muslim population living in that island.

The crews and passengers of Turkish ships captured by Greek cruisers were often put to death: two Ηydriot brigs captured a Turkish ship laden with a valuable cargo, and carrying a number of passengers. Among these was a recently deposed Sheikh-ul-Islam, or patriarch of the Orthodox Muslims, who was said to be going to Mecca for pilgrimage. It was his efforts to prevent the cruel reprisals which, at Constantinople, followed the news of the massacres in Peloponnese, which brought him into disfavor, and caused his exile. There were also several other Turkish families on board. British historian of the Greek revolt, W. Alison Phillips, noted (drawing from Finlay): "The Hydriots murdered them all in cold blood, helpless old men, ladies of rank, beautiful slaves, and little children were butchered like cattle. The venerable old man, whose crime had been an excess of zeal on behalf of the Greeks, was forced to see his family outraged and murdered before his eyes."

== Massacres of Jews ==
Steven Bowman claims that despite the fact that many Jews were killed, they were not targeted specifically: "Such a tragedy seems to be more a side-effect of the butchering of the Turks of Tripolis, the last Ottoman stronghold in the South where the Jews had taken refuge from the fighting, than a specific action against Jews per se." However, in the case of Vrachori, a massacre of a Jewish population occurred first, and the Jewish population in the Peloponnese regardless was effectively decimated, unlike that of the considerable Jewish populations of the Aegean, Epirus and other areas of Greece in the several following conflicts between Greeks and the Ottomans later in the century. Many Jews within Greece and throughout Europe were however supporters of the Greek revolt, and many assisted the Greek cause. Following the state's establishment, it also then attracted many Jewish immigrants from the Ottoman Empire, as one of the first European states in the world to grant legal equality to Jews.
