= Levidis family =

Greek aristocratic family

The House of Levidis (Greek: Λεβίδης) is a Greek aristocratic family with roots from the Byzantine Empire, hailing from Constantinople and with a distinguished role in the history of the Ottoman Empire, the Russian Empire, Wallachia, Egypt and Greece.

== History ==
From as early as the 17th century, members of the family, which had acquired great wealth and political influence, occupied high posts in the Ottoman Empire, as dignitaries in the Imperial Court (the Sublime Porte). They also held important secular offices of the Patriarchate until the outbreak of the Greek War of Independence. During the latter, various members of the family took active part as members of the Filiki Eteria. On the onset of the revolution members of the family played a crucial role in organising a revolt inside the city of Constantinople. Prominent members of the family were accused of planning the destruction of the Turkish fleet and decapitated on Sultan orders. Their bodies were hanged before the doors of the Levidis' mansion in Tatavla in Constantinople. Those who escaped fled to Odessa and formed the Russian branch of the family.

== Notable members ==
- Angelos Levidis (Constantinople 1655–1738), an early distinguished member, because of his wealth he enjoyed a powerful position in the Sultan's court.
- Nikolaos Levidis (1685–1777). Present as a dignitary at the Court. Had been closely associated with the Sultan and the political establishment of the empire.
- Angelos N. Levidis (1725–1810). Also known as Tsalikis. Enjoyed a privileged position in the Ottoman Court. Through his relationship to the Sultan he was granted an exceptional Letter of Privilege allowing him to enter the city on horseback.
- Nikolaos A. Levidis (1765–April 28, 1852). Was a distinguished man of letters and scholar of the Greek Enlightenment. Levidis was born in Tatavla, Constantinople. He had a remarkable education and he was appointed Treasurer of the Great Church of the Patriarchate, before 1821. Due to his outstanding contribution towards the Nation and the Church, Levidis received the hereditary title of Most Noble Archonde, and was also named Grand Dikeophylax (Keeper of the Great Seal) of the Patriarchate, an honorary title bestowed upon him by Patriarch Gregory V. Before the Greek Revolution, Levidis influenced by the French Enlightenment and the Encyclopaedists was active in Constantinople publishing, at his expense, works on historic, philosophic and religious matters. These books included a grammar of the Greek language, published before 1821, an encyclopaedic work translated from the French language, called Elementary knowledge from the French language, Stixiodis gnosseis ek tis Gallikis glossis, (1818), an edition of the collected works of early father of the church, John Chrysostom, another on the comments by Greek educator and famous pedagogist and encyclopaedist of the time Konstantin Vardalach, on the works of early Church Father Saint Gregory of Nazianzus, or Gregory the Theologian. At the time of the 1821 massacres in Constantinople, where three of his brothers perished he was residing in Walachia by the Hospodar Michail Voda Soutzos, where he was active as a member of the Filiki Eteria, initiating Soutzos and many others and financially supporting the secret society, thus preparing the ground for revolt. He later fled to Odessa and afterwards went to Greece during the War of Independence. In 1832, after the assassination of governor Ioannis Kapodistrias, he was appointed to the direction of the newly erected National Mint in Aegina, the first capital of Greece and after leaving public service in 1833, he lived for the most part in retirement. He was one of the first collaborators of the early Greek periodical Hermes o Logios.
- Dimitrios Levidis (also known as Tsalikis) (Constantinople 1768–Constantinople 26 March 1821). On the night of 25 March 1821 he was called to the Ottoman palace for reasons supposedly concerned with his commercial activities and close contacts with the dockyards. He was immediately arrested on suspicion of being involved in the conspiracy of the secret revolutionary society Filiki Eteria to start an uprising in Constantinople. He was personally accused of planning the destruction of the Ottoman fleet inside the docks and/or of organising to seize the Ottoman Navy's entire fleet there and becoming himself the Kapudan Pasha. He was also accused of actively being a member of the Filiki Eteria and of being responsible for his brothers' recruitment in the Sacred Band, a military unit composed of young Greek volunteers who rallied to Alexander Ypsilantis' call for an uprising. He was arrested and subsequently beheaded, shortly before Patriarch Gregory V was hanged. He was one of the first to be executed, followed by about seventy other prominent Greeks from the Phanar, including the Greek Patriarch. His decapitated body was publicly displayed by the front door of the Levidis mansion in Tatavla. The day after the execution a raging crowd looted the house. The surviving members of the Levidis clan that managed to escape thereupon abandoned Constantinople and fled to Odessa.
- Alexander Levidis (1771–27 March 1821). Killed by the raging crowd invading the Levidis mansion, the day after the beheading of his brother Dimitrios.
- Pantaleon Levidis (1773–27 March 1821). Brother of Dimitrios Levidis. Also died in the house of the Levidis the next day of his brother's execution.
- Stamatios Levidis (Constantinople 1790–Syros 1867). A hero of the Greek War of Independence. On the night of 27 March 1821, one day after his brother Demetrios' execution, Stamatios managed to escape the raging crowds that had invaded the family mansion by jumping off a window to the garden below, and took refuge in a neighbouring friendly house. He then fled to Odessa and Paris and after traveling through central Europe, he arrived in Greece to participate in the Greek War of Independence. He distinguished himself in the First Siege of Missolonghi, where his generous founding from his own fortune, allowed the construction of a fortified wall around the town. He succeeded in breaking through the Turkish forces besieging Missolonghi in an attempt to deliver official letters to the island of Zante and managed to raise funds and to provide the besieged city with food and ammunition supplies. For his heroic actions he was named an honorary citizen by the Council of Missolonghi on 4 January 1825. In 1825 he was appointed Chief Administrator and inspector of the army during the campaign of Georgios Kountouriotis. He was called in Hydra and from there he was sent to the island of Cephalonia, amongst great dangers, to meet Lord Byron, where he also contributed in securing a Loan for a sum of 20,000 Austrian Thalers. He also fought in the campaign against the Egyptian forces at Ligovisti and took part in the battles for the defence of Neokastro barely escaping capture in the disaster at Sphacteria, on 9 May 1825, by swimming to Navarino. By orders of Koundouriotis, he was once again sent from Nafplion to Missolonghi where he succeeded in sneaking for a second time through the enemy lines and into the besieged city, thus boosting considerably the morale of the besieged. In 1827, he took over the administration of the army garrison at Phaleron and he fought bravely and obstinately in the fierce battles there. In 1829 he was appointed caretaker of the army in Nafpaktos fighting under general Sir Richard Church in the campaign for the reconquest of Western Greece. Levidis engaged in a correspondence with major figures of his era. Of utmost historic importance is his extended correspondence during the entire War of Independence with his friend Alexandros Mavrokordatos and Georgios Praidas.
- Alexander N. Levidis (Constantinople 1795 - Athens before 1848). At the outbreak of the Greek Revolution in early 1821, he was residing with his father in Wallachia, at the court of Prince Michail Voda Soutzos. Levidis, along with his brother and five cousins, the Ainardaris brothers, joined the ranks of Ypsilantis' Sacred Band. He fought under Alexander Ypsilantis and alongside Giorgakis Olympios. He thereupon arrived in Greece in order to participate in the War of Independence, where he took part in many battles and served as an officer of the tactical army under the French Philhellene, Colonel Charles Fabvier together with whom he entered the besieged Acropolis of Athens on the night of 12 December 1826.
- Periklis Levidis (Constantinople 1798–Braila ?) Brother of the above. Studied Fine Arts in Italy well before 1821 and worked successfully as a painter in Wallachia in the style of Raphael.
- Constantine Levidis (Constantinople 1790–Athens, 4 October 1868) was a Greek scholar, writer, editor, considered as "the father of Greek journalism". Noted for his vociferously pro-constitutional stance during the reign of King Otto.
- Dimitrios N. Levidis (Constantinople 1806 - Athens 1893), was a Greek statesman. Managed to escape the Constantinople massacres and flee to Odessa with his family, under the protection of the famous General Prince Mikhail Semyonovich Vorontsov, then governor of Odessa. Prince Vorontsov owed to the Levidis family, who had supported him before the Grand Vizier during an earlier diplomatic visit to Constantinople. Levidis finished his studies in Accountancy as a bursar of Tsar Alexander I at the lycée Richelieu in Odessa, having Alexandros Rizos Rangavis and Constantine Paparrigopoulos as classmates. After graduation, Levidis was under obligation to serve as officer in the Imperial Russian army, but soon persuaded the Emperor to grant him special permission to leave the army and go to Greece, in order to join the Greek War of Independence. After Independence, he was appointed by Greek governor Ioannis Kapodistrias public commissioner in Nafplion. Later he was Chief Accountant of the General Accounts Office and, in 1846, Minister of Finance. Served twice as Minister of Finance at the cabinet of the Epameinondas Deligeorgis government (1876–77). He was the founder of the Political Employees Fund (TPY).
- Georgios N. Levidis (? – Braila ?) Brother of the above. He was educated at the lycée Richelieu as a bursar of the Tsar Alexander I, and became a rich merchant in Wallachia and man of letters.
- Miltiadis Levidis (Odessa 1821–Athens 1878). The son of Dimitrios A. Levidis, he was born in Odessa. His father was killed in the Constantinople massacres when the Greek War of Independence erupted in 1821. His mother, who survived the slaughters fled and sought refuge in Odessa. He followed a military career as an artillery officer in the Hellenic Army.
- General Constantine Levidis (Athens 30 May 1862 – 1928). Son of the above, he served as an army officer, rising to the rank of lieutenant general of the artillery and aide de camp to King Constantine I of Greece. He participated in the Greco-Turkish War of 1897 and the Balkan Wars of 1912-13.
- Spyridon Miltiadis Levidis (died 1937), a Greek diplomat, ambassador and author.
- General Nikolaos Levidis (1868–1921), a cavalry officer, he rose to the rank of lieutenant general. He took part in the Greco-Turkish War of 1897, in the Balkan Wars of 1912-13 and the Greco-Turkish War of 1919-1922.
- Nikolaos Dimitrios Levidis (1848–1942), a Greek statesman and politician. A distinguished Greek politician, prominent author and orator, sat as Member of Parliament for Attica and Boeotia eleven times between 1881 and 1920, and became a member of successive cabinets. He served as wartime Navy Minister in the Theodoros Deligiannis cabinet during the Greco-Turkish War of 1897, Minister of the Interior in 1903, and Minister of Justice in the Georgios Theotokis cabinet (1904). Elected President of the Greek Cabinet 1906-1907. In 1908 he was again Minister of the Interior in the new Theotokis cabinet. Later, President of the National Assembly. An avid essayist, in addition to writing numerous articles for the periodicals of his time, he wrote a number of historical and political studies. His funeral oration for the centenary of the death of General Georgios Karaiskakis, delivered at the Odeon of Herodes Atticus in 1927, was translated in many languages. Was one of the founders of the Parnassos literary society, in Athens. He was president of the Brotherhood of the Holy Sepulchre, awarded the Grand Cross of the Order of the Holy Sepulchre, and was the recipient of numerous Greek and foreign decorations.
- George D Levidis (1857–1933) was a Greek diplomat, ambassador of Greece in many of the world's capitals, including Alexandria, Constantinople, Saint Petersburg and Madrid.
- Admiral Alexander G. Levidis was a high-ranking Hellenic Navy officer, aide-de-camp of President Pavlos Koundouriotis (1928), and in 1931 became the first Director of Civil Aviation. During World War II he founded the undercover resistance group 'Maleas', focused on aiding the escape of British servicemen and Allied personnel to the Middle East. In 1943 he was caught and imprisoned by the Germans. He was released April 1945 and after the pull out of the German Forces he became Vice Minister for the Repatriation of the Refugies in the governments of Petros Voulgaris and Archbishop Damaskinos. In 1946 he was promoted to Rear Admiral.
- Dimitrios Levidis (Athens, 8 April 1885/1886 - Palaio Faliro, 29 May 1951) was a Greek composer, who later became a naturalized French citizen. He studied with Mottl, and composition with Richard Strauss. He was a notable experimenter, with novel combinations and new instruments: His interest in new sounds led him to be the first to write for the Ondes Martenot (his Poème symphonique, given on the occasion of the first public appearance of the instrument, premiered in 1928 at the Paris Opéra).
- Dimitrios N Levidis, (1891–1964), was a Hellenic Army officer. He served during both Balkan Wars and the Greco-Turkish War of 1919-1922. He had been attached to the Greek Court since 1917, becoming Master of the Household to George II of Greece and Chamberlain, and liaison officer to the King of England. Later Grand Master of Ceremonies and Grand Marshal of the Court. He followed the royal family into exile in 1923 and again during the Second World War, accompanying King George to exile in Cairo and then to London.
- Michel Levidis (Alexandria, 12 August 1921-1979) inherited a vast landed estate in the Kingdom of Egypt. He served in the Greek and British navies during the Second World War. After the Egyptian Revolution of 1952 by Mohammed Naguib and Gamal Abdel Nasser, Michel Levidis went into exile in Australia with his wife, Rosa Levidis (1922-2013), a British linguist and intelligence officer in the Arab World. Later generations of the family established prominent careers in business and academia. Their son became the head of an international construction and security conglomerate. Their grandson, Dr Andrew Levidis, is a historian of modern Japan and international history. He completed his education at Kyoto, Harvard University and Cambridge, and is a professor at the Australian National University. His younger brother, Michael, is a practising psychologist and adviser on higher education policy.
