= Nasuhzade Ali Pasha =

Ottoman admiral

- Nasuhzade Ali Paşa
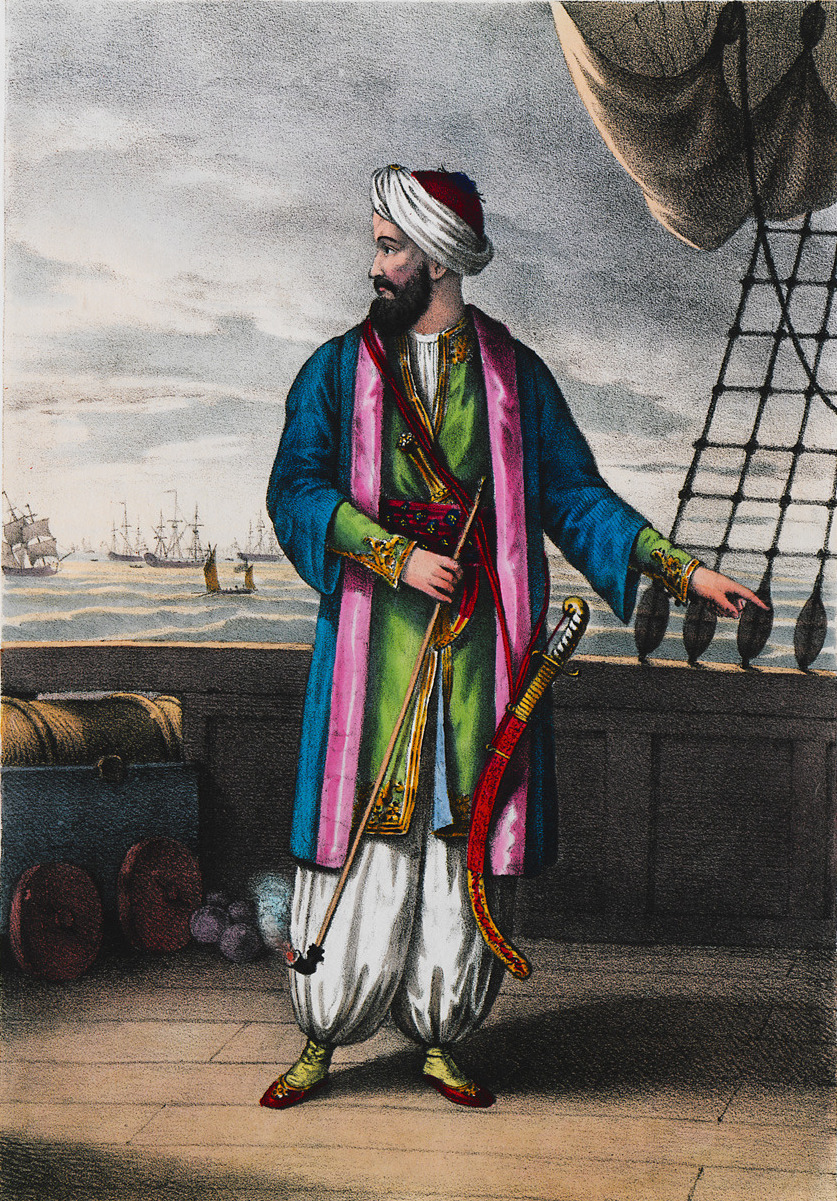
- Depiction of Ali Pasha by Adam Friedel.

Kapudan Pasha
- In office 1821–1822
- Monarch: Mahmud II

Personal details
- Born: Shkodra, Rumelia Eyalet, Ottoman Empire (modern Albania)
- Died: 18/19 June 1822 Chios, Eyalet of the Archipelago, Ottoman Empire (modern Greece)

Military service
- Allegiance: Ottoman Empire
- Branch/service: Ottoman Navy; Ottoman Army
- Years of service: c. 1810–1822
- Rank: Grand Admiral
- Battles/wars: Greek War of Independence

Nasuhzade Ali Pasha (Turkish: Nasuhzade Ali Paşa), commonly known as Kara Ali Pasha, was an Albanian admiral of the Ottoman navy during the early stages of the Greek War of Independence. In 1821, as second-in-command of the Ottoman navy, he succeeded in resupplying the isolated Ottoman fortresses in the Peloponnese, while his subordinate Ismael Gibraltar destroyed Galaxeidi. Promoted to Kapudan Pasha (commander-in-chief of the navy), and led the suppression of the revolt in Chios and the ensuing Chios massacre in April 1822. He was killed when a fireship captained by Konstantinos Kanaris blew up his flagship in Chios harbour on the night of 18/19 June 1822.

== Origin ==
He hailed from an Albanian family in Shkodra, and was much esteemed for his ability; at the time of his appointment as Kapudan Pasha, the then Austrian ambassador to the Sublime Porte qualified him as "the only intelligent and educated officer of the navy".

== In the Greek War of Independence ==
=== 1821 expedition to the Peloponnese and Corinthian Gulf ===
As the Kapitan Bey, the Ottoman fleet's second-in-command, in August 1821 he led a sortie from the Dardanelles, commanding a squadron of three ships of the line, five frigates, and twenty smaller vessels (corvettes and brigs), joined by squadrons from Egypt and Algeria. The fleets of the Greek islanders that had risen in revolt had disbanded and returned home at the time, so the Ottomans were easily able to sail unopposed. The fleet ferried supplies and ammunition to the fortresses of Methoni and Koroni, thus preventing their surrender to the Greeks who were besieging them. From there the fleet moved to Patras, where it arrived on 18 September and disembarked reinforcements that allowed the local Ottoman commander, Yusuf Pasha, to break the Greek blockade of the city. On 1 October, the Egyptian squadron under Ismael Gibraltar destroyed the coastal town of Galaxeidi and burned or captured its fleet, the largest in western Greece.

With the sailing season now advanced, Ali decided to return to Constantinople. At Zakynthos, which was under British control, he learned that the Greek fleet under Andreas Miaoulis, 35 vessels strong, had gathered to confront him on his return. The two fleets engaged in indecisive fighting off the western coast of the Peloponnese, but Ali, determined to avoid direct confrontation and thus risk the ships he had captured at Galaxeidi, was pushed back to Zakynthos. Only when a favourable wind blew again did he depart, and returned safely to the Ottoman capital, with 35 captured vessels in tow. As a result of this success, Sultan Mahmud II promoted Ali to Kapudan Pasha, commander-in-chief of the entire Ottoman navy.

=== 1822 expedition to Chios ===
On 22 March 1822, the revolutionary leader of Samos Island, Lykourgos Logothetis, landed at Chios, a wealthy island whose production of mastic gave it a privileged place as the supplier of the Ottoman court. The Greek expeditionary force on the island was not well organized, nor did it enjoy significant naval support. As a result, the Sultan mobilized his forces against the island, with Ali leading the naval arm of the operation. The Ottoman fleet of 46 ships arrived at the island on 11 April, and on the next day landed 7,000 men on the island. After a brief resistance, Logothetis and his Samiots embarked on their ships and fled, leaving the Chiots behind to suffer the consequences: although the populace was generally unarmed and had been very reluctant to join the Samiots, they were treated as rebels, with many thousands executed and most of the rest carted off to slave markets. Ali tried to intervene and spare the rural population from destruction, and particularly the valuable mastic villages, as their survival was the foundation of the island's continued prosperity (and the tax proceeds it remitted to Constantinople). On 17 April, he called on the foreign consuls to announce an amnesty to the inhabitants of the island, and on 22 April the elders of the mastic villages appeared before him in submission, accompanied by the French and Austrian consuls. The mastic villages were thus spared destruction, but much of the rest of the island was not; even in cases where villages submitted and handed over their weapons, they were then subject to looting and destruction.

Vehid Pasha, the commander of the Chios garrison, then suggested to Ali to use the opportunity to attack the Greek strongholds at Samos and the nearby island of Psara, but Ali refused, saying that these were well fortified, and that once the weather improved he had orders to sail for the Peloponnese. The two commanders became increasingly hostile to one another, as Vehid put his support behind continued reprisals and massacres on the island, while Ali was eager to see order restored. Vehid and his soldiers began suspecting Ali of being sympathetic to the Greeks, while Ali sent repeated dispatches criticising Vehid's conduct to Constantinople, and is even reported to have tried to recruit some of his crews to assassinate his rival. At long last, Ali's protestations, along with those of the European consuls and the Sultan's sister Esma Sultan, led to the dismissal and banishment of Vehid.

== Death ==
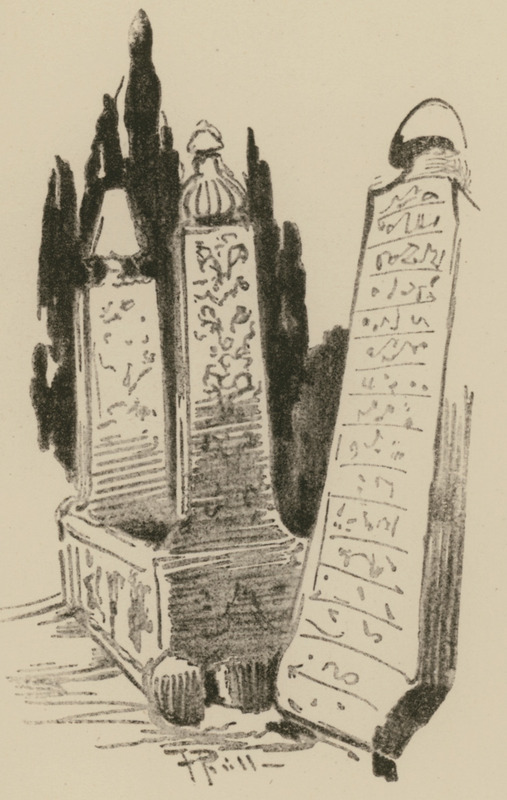
Sketch of Ali's tomb on the island of Chios, 1928.

While the Greek fleet under Miaoulis belatedly set sail for Chios, the Ottoman fleet under Ali remained at the island to spend Ramadan. An indecisive combat between the two fleets ensued on 12 May, 19 May, and the night of 31 May. The Greeks unsuccessfully attempted to use fireships against the Ottoman ships of the line, while the latter, despite being much heavier and more powerful than the Greek vessels, avoided combat.

On 18 June, Ali held a great feast on his flagship, the 84-gun ship of the line Mansur al-liwa, to celebrate Eid al-Fitr and the end of Ramadan. The entire fleet was illuminated in celebration, allowing two Greek vessels to approach them under cover of night. One of them, commanded by Konstantinos Kanaris, made for the flagship, while the other, under Andreas Pipinos, headed for the ship of the second-in-command. Unlike his colleague, Kanaris managed to latch his fireship firmly onto the Ottoman vessel, which was quickly engulfed by flame. Chaos broke out on its deck. According to contemporary European reports, Ali's officers led him to board a boat, but at that moment he was struck by a falling spar and died soon after he was brought ashore. However, the eyewitness Vehid Pasha claims in his memoirs that he was killed when the ship's gunpowder magazine exploded, and that his blackened corpse was thrown to the beach, where it was found.

Ali's second-in-command brought the fleet back to the Dardanelles, while Chios, including the mastic villages, was ravaged anew by the Ottoman soldiery in revenge. Ali's corpse was washed and buried in the Castle of Chios, where his tomb survives to this day.

== See also ==
- Greek War of Independence
- Ottoman Navy

== Sources ==
- Anderson, R. C. (1952). Naval Wars in the Levant 1559–1853. Princeton: Princeton University Press.
- Finlay, George (1861). History of the Greek Revolution, Vol. I. Edinburgh and London: William Blackwood and Sons.
- Vakalopoulos, Apostolos E. (1982). Ιστορία του νέου ελληνισμού, Τόμος ΣΤ′: Η Μεγάλη Ελληνική Επανάσταση (1821–1829) – Η εσωτερική κρίση (1822–1825) [History of modern Hellenism, Volume VI: The Great Greek Revolution (1821–1829) – Internal Crisis (1822–1825)] (in Greek). Thessaloniki.
