= Constantine Levidis =

Greek scholar

Constantine N. Levidis (Greek: Κωνσταντίνος Λεβίδης; 1790, Constantinople – October 4, 1868, Athens) was a Greek scholar, writer, editor, and journalist. Noted for his attempt to turn the Kingdom of Greece into a constitutional monarchy.

== Early life ==
Levidis was born in Tatavla, Constantinople to the Levidis family, a noble Greek family of Byzantine origins. His father was Nikolaos A. Levidis, a man of letters, editor of many books and a prominent figure among the Greeks influenced by the Age of Enlightenment. His mother was also a woman of letters, highly educated and talented in music and languages.

Levidis studied greatly throughout his youth. A polyglot, he spoke Albanian, Ancient Greek, English, French, German, Italian, Latin and Turkish with graceful fluency. He was passionate about history, literature and political sciences and graduated the University of Vienna before 1821, along with classmate Dimitri Kalergis. (Kalergis was later to become the prime mover in the Greek coup d'état of 1843, an insurrection which forced Otto of Greece to grant a proper constitution. resulting in the Greek Constitution of 1844).

It was also in Vienna were Levidis was initiated by Atanas Bogoridi in Filiki Eteria, the revolutionary organisation. When the Greek War of Independence broke out, Constantine along with his brother Alexander traveled to the Danubian Principalities in order to volunteer to the Sacred Band, the revolutionary Greek battalion in Wallachia. He fought under Prince Alexander Ypsilantis and took part in the Battle of Drăgăşani (June 19, 1821).

== Life in Greece ==
After the formation of the First Hellenic Republic, Levidis became a public servant, appointed by governor Ioannis Kapodistrias to several important administrative committees and posts. In 1832, the Republic was succeeded by the Kingdom of Greece, with the underage Prince Otto of Bavaria as the first King of Greece. During his minority, Bavarian advisors were arrayed in a council of regency headed by Count Josef Ludwig von Armansperg.

During the regency of the Bavarian council, Levidis was Councillor of the Finances. But soon found himself opposed and in 1836, after a severe clash with the regents he founded at an early period for the Greek press the historic newspaper Elpis or l'Esperance,(1836–1868) which he edited bilingually, first in Greek and German, later in Greek and French, with great ability till his death. The Nestor of the modern Greek Press, Levidis was a well-meaning patriot.

By his talented and powerful writing in that journal, Levidis he mainly criticised to the outmost the Bavarian rule, first under the regency of Count Josef Ludwig von Armansperg and then under Otto himself. From the very first issue Levidis asked for the establishment of a proper constitution for the newly liberated Greek State. He distinguished himself by his violent attacks on the Bavarian-dominated regency but his fierce criticism and opposition nearly cost Levidis his life.

In November 1837, only a year after the publication of the Elpis an attempt was made to assassinate Levidis. A Bavarian major named Feder, together with his company of ten more Bavarian army officers, attacked Levidis in the historic Athenian coffeehouse I Oraia Ellas where Levidis was a regular and he had been peacefully reading. Thanks to the intervention of the many civilians who rushed to defend him the Bavarians withdrew. Consequently, his press was confiscated the publication of the Elpis was forcefully interrupted.

In 1843, Levidis actively participated and was one of the protagonists in the Greek coup d'état of 1843 over the adoption of a constitution, and in November he was first secretary and representative of Crete and of Messenia at the National Assembly of the same year. The Elpis resumed publication in 1844 right after the establishment of the constitution.

In 1854, during the Crimean War the United Kingdom of Great Britain and Ireland and the Second French Empire occupied Piraeus to prevent Greece declaring war on the Ottoman Empire. Greece was an ally of the Russian Empire and expected to join its side unless prevented. During the occupation, Elpis engaged in editorial attacks against the occupying Powers and were sympathetic to Russia. Because of his severe criticism, Levidis was briefly imprisoned by the French occupation forces.

A proponent of the English Party, Levidis was a friend and political ally to Prince Alexander Mavrocordatos. His library was among the most treasured of his time and the salon at his large mansion in Patisia in Athens assembled and entertained many well-known politicians, army officers and aristocrats of the era.

== Literary activities ==
A prolific author, Levidis published many books about the society, politics and history of his times. These works include an important study on King Otto, published in French, Quelques mots sur la Grece et l'ex Roi Othon: Adresses a l' opinion publique du monde civilise, Bruxelles 1863, another on the newly founded Greek state, Le Gouvernement et l'Administration en Grece depuis 1833 par un temoin oculaire Genes 1863 and a long historical and political treatise, La race hellenique et l' Occident.Η ελληνική φυλή και η Δύσις : Απάντησις εις την Συνταγματικήν, 1856.

He coedited, with Alexander Rangabes, a French-Greek Lexicon in 1837, and also an Anglo-Greek dictionary. C.N Levidis also left behind a number of unpublished works of great importance. Among them, a History of the Filiki Eteria and a History of the Ottoman Empire.
