= Gilles Néret =

French art historian and publisher (1933–2005)

Gilles Néret

Gilles Néret (Paris, 6 November 1933 – 3 August 2005, Paris) was a French art historian and publisher.

== Early life ==
Born in 1933, he went to London in 1951 where he worked as a journalist for Agence France-Presse for three years.

== Career ==
On his return to France, he worked for the magazine Constellation before going to Japan where he organized retrospectives on Auguste Renoir, Fernand Léger and Salvador Dalí before founding the Seibu museum and the Wildenstein gallery of Tokyo.

He published numerous works on the painting of Monet, Manet and Velasquez and published works on Dalí in collaboration with Robert Descharnes. Many of them are published by Taschen.

He was awarded the Prix Élie-Faure in 1981 for the collection of art books at the École des grands pintres, which he directed at Éditions de Vergeures.

== Selected publications ==
- Henri de Toulouse-Lautrec 1864-1901, 1995
- Auguste Rodin, 1998
- Gustav Klimt 1862-1918, Taschen, Köln, 2000 ISBN 382285980X
- Kazimir Malevich 1878-1935, 2007
- Salvador Dalí: The Paintings, Taschen, Köln, 2007
- Matisse, Taschen, Köln
- Erotica Universalis, Taschen, Köln.
