= Navarino massacre =

1821 event of the Greek War of Independence

Siege of Navarino
- Part of the Greek War of Independence
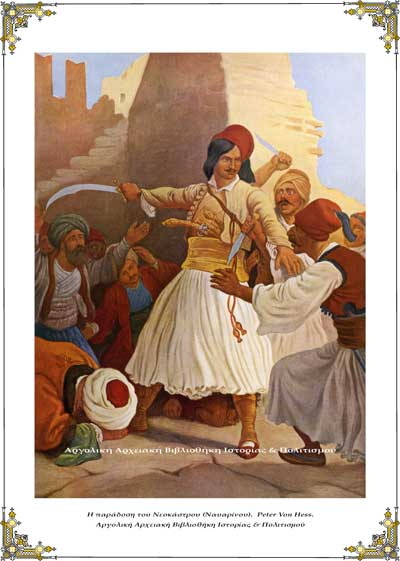
- "Surrender of Neocastro" by Peter von Hess
Date	March – 19 August 1821
Location	Navarino, Morea Eyalet, Ottoman Empire (now Messenia, Greece) 36.912°N 21.691°E
Result	Greek victory

Belligerents
Greek revolutionaries	Ottoman Empire

Commanders and leaders
Konstantinos Pierrakos Mavromichalis †	Unknown

Casualties and losses
Unknown	Unknown
- Around 3,000 Turkish civilians killed
- Location of Navarino

The siege of Navarino was one of the earliest battles of the Greek War of Independence. It resulted in one of a series of massacres which resulted in the extermination of the Turkish civilian population of the region.

== Siege of the fortress ==
In March 1821 the Greeks began the siege of Neokastro under the leadership of Konstantinos Pierrakos Mavromichalis. Before the fortress capitulated in August, many Turkish families had been compelled by hunger to escape and throw themselves at the mercy of Greeks of the neighbourhood. However, they were massacred. The Turks, who were at the brink of starvation, offered to surrender. The Greeks proposed a convention where the surrendering Turks would be granted secure passage to Egypt. When the capitulation was concluded, the city's Turks gave up all the public property in the fortress and all of their money, plates and jewels. However, the Greeks had neither the intention nor even the means of providing that promised secure passage. Using as pretext the death of their leader, Mavromichalis, who was killed during the siege, they failed to keep the terms of the surrender.

One of the Greek negotiators, Poniropoulos, boasted some years later to General Thomas Gordon that he destroyed the copy of capitulation that had been given to the Turks, so that no proof would remain of any such transaction having been concluded.

== Massacre of Turks ==
When the gates opened on 19 August (O. S. 7 August) 1821, the Greeks rushed in and around 3,000 Turks were killed, with the exception of some who managed to escape.

Historian George Finlay noted that a Greek priest, named Phrantzes, was an eyewitness to the massacres. Based on the descriptions provided by Phrantzes, he wrote:

"Women, wounded with musketballs and sabre-cuts, rushed to the sea, seeking to escape, and were deliberately shot. Mothers robbed of their clothes, with infants in their arms plunged into the sea to conceal themselves from shame, and they were them made a mark for inhuman riflemen. Greeks seized infants from their mother's breasts and dashed them against rocks. Children, three and four years old, were hurled living into the sea and left to drown. When the massacre was ended, the dead bodies washed ashore, or piled on the beach, threatened to cause a pestilence..."

== See also ==
- Massacres during the Greek Revolution
- Siege of Tripolitsa
