= Kanaris =

Kanaris may refer to:

== People ==
- Kanaris family members:
  - Aristeidis Kanaris (1831–1863), Greek Army officer, son of Konstantinos Kanaris
  - Konstantinos Kanaris (1790–1877), Greek admiral and statesman
  - Miltiadis Kanaris (1822–1901), Greek admiral and politician, son of Konstantinos Kanaris

== Other uses ==
- Greek ship Kanaris, several ships named after Konstantinos Kanaris

== See also ==
- Canaris (disambiguation)
