= Greek ship Kanaris =

The following ships of the Hellenic Navy have borne the name Kanaris (Greek: Κανάρης) after the Greek admiral and statesman Konstantinos Kanaris:

- Greek gunboat Kanaris, launched in 1835.
- Greek auxiliary ship Kanaris, a former British freighter launched in 1880 as Psara, used as a torpedo boat tender.
- Greek destroyer Kanaris (L53), a Hunt-class destroyer launched in 1941 as HMS Hatherleigh but transferred to Greece and renamed before completion. She was returned to the Royal Navy in 1959 and scrapped in 1960.
- Greek destroyer Kanaris (D212), a Gearing-class destroyer launched in 1945 as USS Stickell. She was renamed on transfer to Greece in 1972 and scrapped in 2002.
- Greek frigate Kanaris (F-464), an Elli-class frigate launched in 1981 as HNLMS Jan van Brakel. She was transferred to Greece in 2002 and renamed.

== See also ==
- Kanaris (disambiguation)
