= Canaris =

Canaris may refer to:

== People ==
- Claus-Wilhelm Canaris (1937–2021), German jurist
- Constantine Canaris (1790–1877), Greek admiral and statesman
- Wilhelm Canaris (1887–1945), German admiral and spymaster

== Other uses ==
- Cañari, a native tribe in Ecuador
- Cañaris District, Ferreñafe, Peru
- Canaris (film), a 1954 West German biopic
- Canaris (album), a 2008 album by Chris Brokaw

== See also ==
- Canaries (disambiguation)
- Kanaris (disambiguation)
