= Aristeidis Karnalis =

Aristeidis Karnalis (Greek: Αριστείδης Καρνάλης) was a Greek Army officer who reached the rank of major general and served twice as Minister for Military Affairs of Greece.

Karnalis was born at Constantinople to a well-off family. When the Greek War of Independence broke out in 1821, he was studying at an Italian university, but abandoned his studies, went to Greece, and joined the nascent regular army. When the Hellenic Army Academy was founded in 1828, he was one of its first students, and continued his military studies in Bavaria and France.

On his return, he served as head of the personnel department of the Ministry for Military Affairs. Among his other duties, he also translated the French Army regulations on infantry drills, campaign, and fortresses into Greek. He served as Minister for Military Affairs, but clashed with King Otto, and resigned. He served the second time as Minister in the 1864 cabinet of Konstantinos Kanaris, where he helped to restore discipline in the army following the rebellion and ousting of Otto in 1862.

He retired with the rank of major general, and died at Athens in 1880.
