= Greek raid on Alexandria (1825) =

1825 Greek military raid of Egyptian fleet base in Alexandria

- Part of the Greek War of Independence
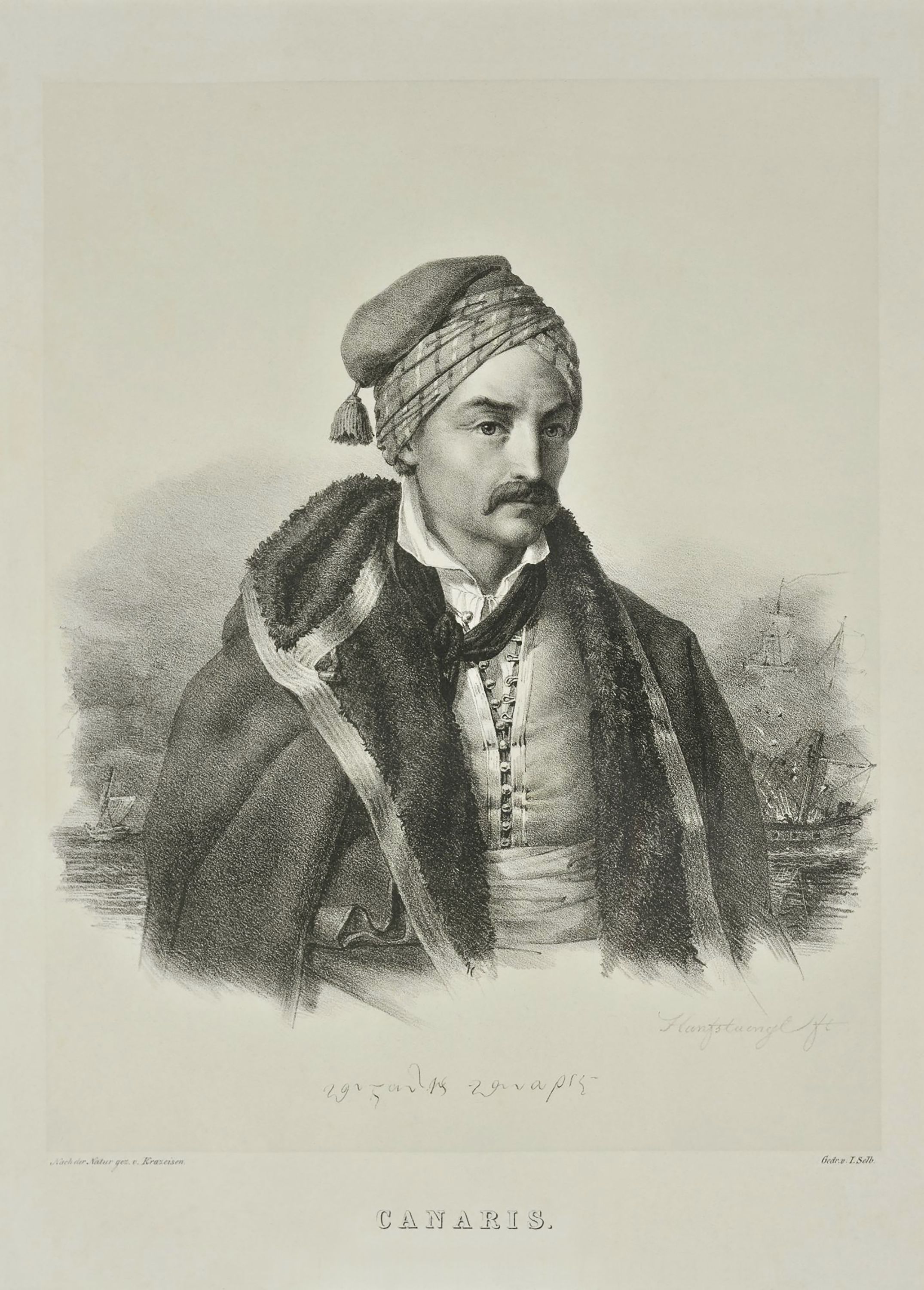
- Kanaris by Karl Krazeisen
Date	August 4, 1825
Location	Alexandria Port 31°12′16″N 29°52′48″E
Result	Unsuccessful

The Greek raid on Alexandria was an unsuccessful attempt organized by Greek admiral Konstantinos Kanaris to destroy the Egyptian fleet at its base in Alexandria in 1825 during the Greek War of Independence.

In February 1825, an Egyptian army under the command of Ibrahim Pasha had landed in the Morea, and inflicted a series of defeats on the Greeks. Kanaris decided if he could destroy the Egyptian fleet, he would cut off Ibrahim Pasha from being supplied from Egypt.

On August 4, 1825, a Greek force consisting of two warships and three fire ships sailed from Hydra, under the overall command of Emmanouil Tombazis on the corvette Themistocles, the other ships being the brig of Kriezis, two Hydriot fireships (under Antonios Vokos and Manolis Boutis) and Kanaris' own Psarian fire ship. The Greek fire ships under the command of Kanaris entered the Alexandria harbor while flying the flags of Russia, Austria and the Ionian islands.

Once inside, the wind suddenly changed direction, rending a fire ship attack almost impossible and the one ship that did strike the Egyptian fleet was pushed away by the Egyptians before it could engulf the Egyptian ship in flames. Had it not been for the sudden change of the wind, Kanaris's three fireships would have struck the closely packed Egyptian fleet and might have inflicted much damage. The rest of the Greek ships had to make an escape while under heavy Egyptian fire as both the Egyptian ships and shore batteries brought down a heavy cannonade. Alexandria harbour lit up with cannon fire, but the Egyptian gunners were not accurate and all of the Greek ships escaped. Mohammad Ali, the wali (governor) of Egypt was furious about the escape of Kanaris's force. The American doctor Samuel Gridley Howe wrote about the raid: "Such, such are the few men who redeem the Grecian character, they shine like diamonds among filth, they are brave, disinterested, enlightened patriots, who are willing and ready to die for their country. Oh, it delights me to think of it". Though Kanaris and the rest of the Greek fleet displayed much bravery, the raid was a fiasco.
