= John H. Stickell =

American aviator (1913–1943)

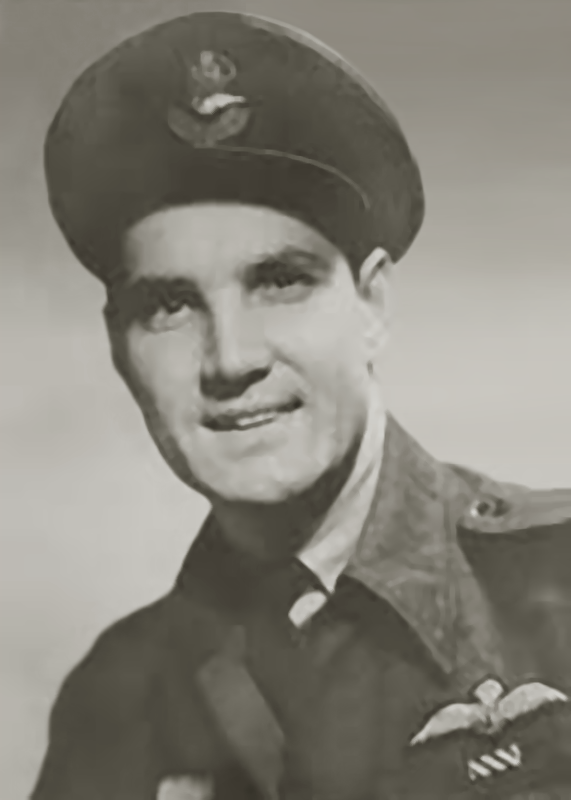
- Lt. John Harlan Stickell
- Born: July 31, 1913; Gilson, Illinois
- Died: December 19, 1943 (aged 30)
- Military career
- Allegiance: Canada; United States
- Branch: Royal Canadian Air Force; United States Navy
- Rank: Lieutenant
- Conflicts: World War II
- Awards: Distinguished Flying Cross (UK); Distinguished Service Order; Distinguished Flying Cross (US); Air Medal; Navy Cross

John Harlan Stickell (July 31, 1913 – December 19, 1943) was an American aviator in the Royal Canadian Air Force and United States Navy during World War II.

== Biography ==
Stickell was born in Gilson, Illinois, on July 31, 1913. He attended Bradley Polytechnic Institute for nearly two years before joining the Royal Canadian Air Force. Before the United States' entry into World War II, he served with the Path Finding Force in England and received both the British Distinguished Flying Cross (gazetted 6 November 1942) and the Distinguished Service Order (gazetted 11 June 1943) for his outstanding service in heavy bomber missions over Germany.

He accepted an appointment as a lieutenant in the United States Naval Reserve, to date from March 29, 1943, and reported to Naval Forces, Europe, for active duty and transportation to the United States. Lt. Stickell was attached to the Bureau of Aeronautics from early April until late May, and then assigned to the Naval Air Training Center at Corpus Christi, Tex., for indoctrination in naval aircraft. He completed training on August 5 and, on the 19th, he reported to the Pacific Fleet Air Wing for duty. He was assigned to Bombing Squadron 108 (VB-108), based on Nukufetau Airfield in the Ellice Islands.

During his combat service, Lt. Stickell conducted search and reconnaissance missions during the Gilberts-Marshalls campaign. His skill and ability contributed to the destruction of three enemy planes, the sinking of an enemy boat and possibly of a cargo vessel. For the two actions in which these events occurred, Lt. Stickell was awarded the Distinguished Flying Cross and the Air Medal.

Lt. Stickell volunteered for a hazardous, two-plane bombing strike on December 13, 1943, against an underground oil storage tank located on Jabor at Jaluit Atoll in the Marshall Islands. Seriously wounded by antiaircraft fire during the tree-top level approach, Lt. Stickell ignored his wounds and steadfastly carried on with his mission. His plane scored a direct hit on the target; but upon commencing the return flight, he was forced to relinquish control of the plane to his copilot. Preferring to risk his own life and well-being rather than that of his crew, Lt. Stickell ordered his co-pilot to pass up the dangerously-narrow airstrip at Tarawa and head for a wider and safer field over 400 miles (640 km) away, significantly delaying treatment of his wounds. Lt. Stickell died of those wounds six days later. For his gallantry and selfless sacrifice, he was posthumously awarded the Navy Cross.

== Namesake ==
In 1945, the destroyer USS Stickell was named in his honor.

Stickell Field on Eniwetok was also named in his honor.

== See also ==
Genealogy Record at www.Stickels.org
