= Canaries =

Canaries may refer to:

- Canary Islands, an archipelago in the Atlantic belonging to Spain
- Canaries, Saint Lucia, a village on the Caribbean island of Saint Lucia
- Canaries, birds in the genera Serinus and Crithagra
- Canary (court dance), a lively 16th century court dance in Europe
- "The Canaries", the nickname of several football teams
  - Norwich City F.C., from England
  - Hitchin Town F.C., from England
  - RFK Novi Sad 1921, from Serbia
  - FC Nantes, from France
  - Botev Plovdiv, from Bulgaria
- Sioux Falls Canaries and Sioux Falls Canaries (1902–1953), the baseball teams from South Dakota
- Canaries (film), 1969 film by Jerome Hill
- Canaries (Arrow), an episode of Arrow

== See also ==
- Canary (disambiguation)
- Canarese
- Canaris (disambiguation)
