= Lazaros Fytalis =

Greek sculptor (1831–1909)

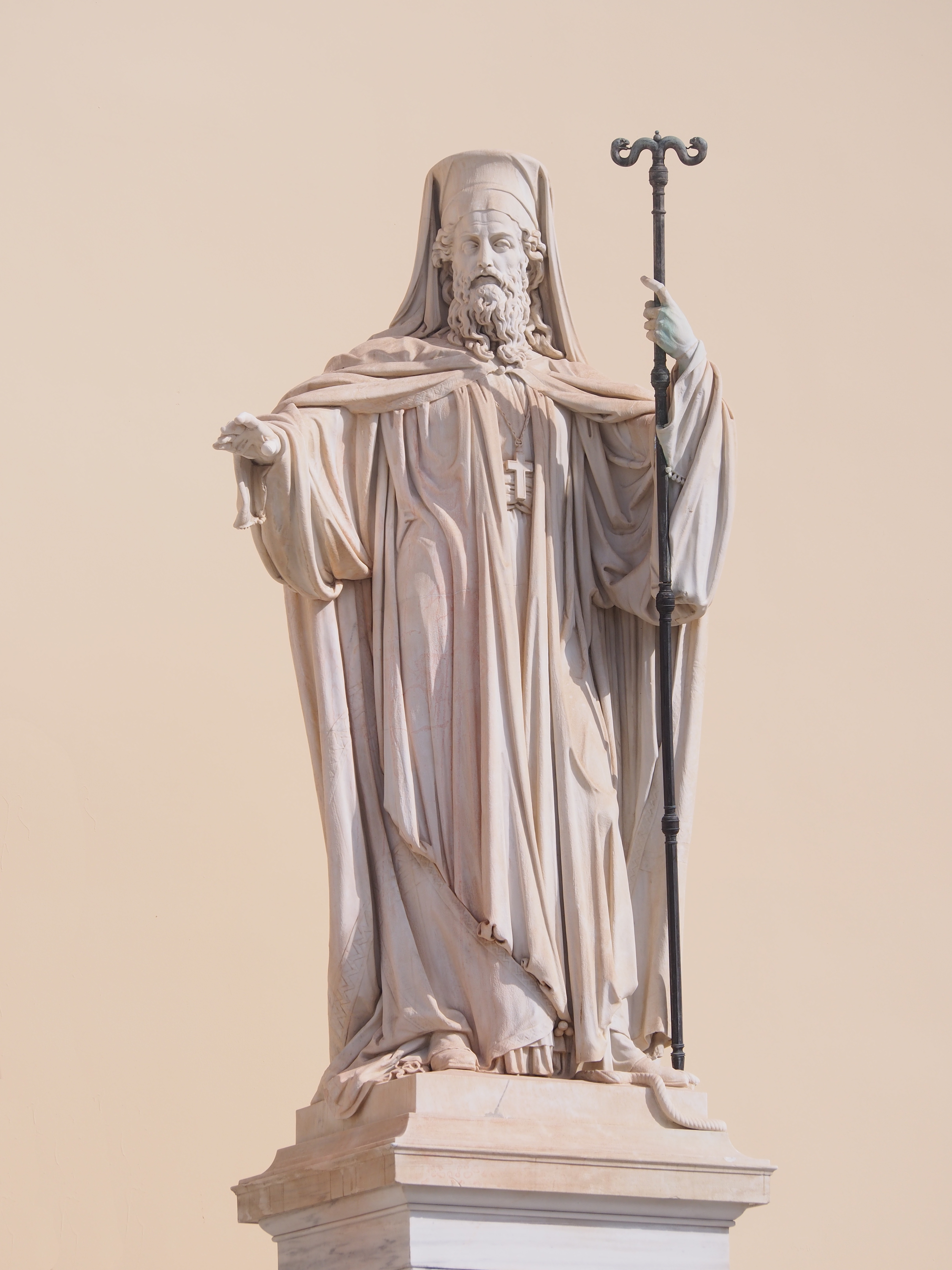
- The statue of Patriarch Gregory V at the University of Athens, work of Lazaros Fytalis
- Born: 1831; Tinos
- Died: 1909 (aged 77–78); Athens

Lazaros Fytalis (Greek: Λάζαρος Φυτάλης; 1831–1909) was a Greek sculptor of the 19th century. Born in Tinos in 1831, he later studied in Athens and was a pupil of Leonidas Drosis. His work includes several statues and busts in Athens and other Greek cities. Fytalis died in Athens in 1909.

His elder brother Georgios Fytalis was also a renowned sculptor.

== Selected works ==
Among the sculptures of Lazaros Fytalis are the statues of Patriarch Gregory V and Konstantinos Kanaris in Athens.

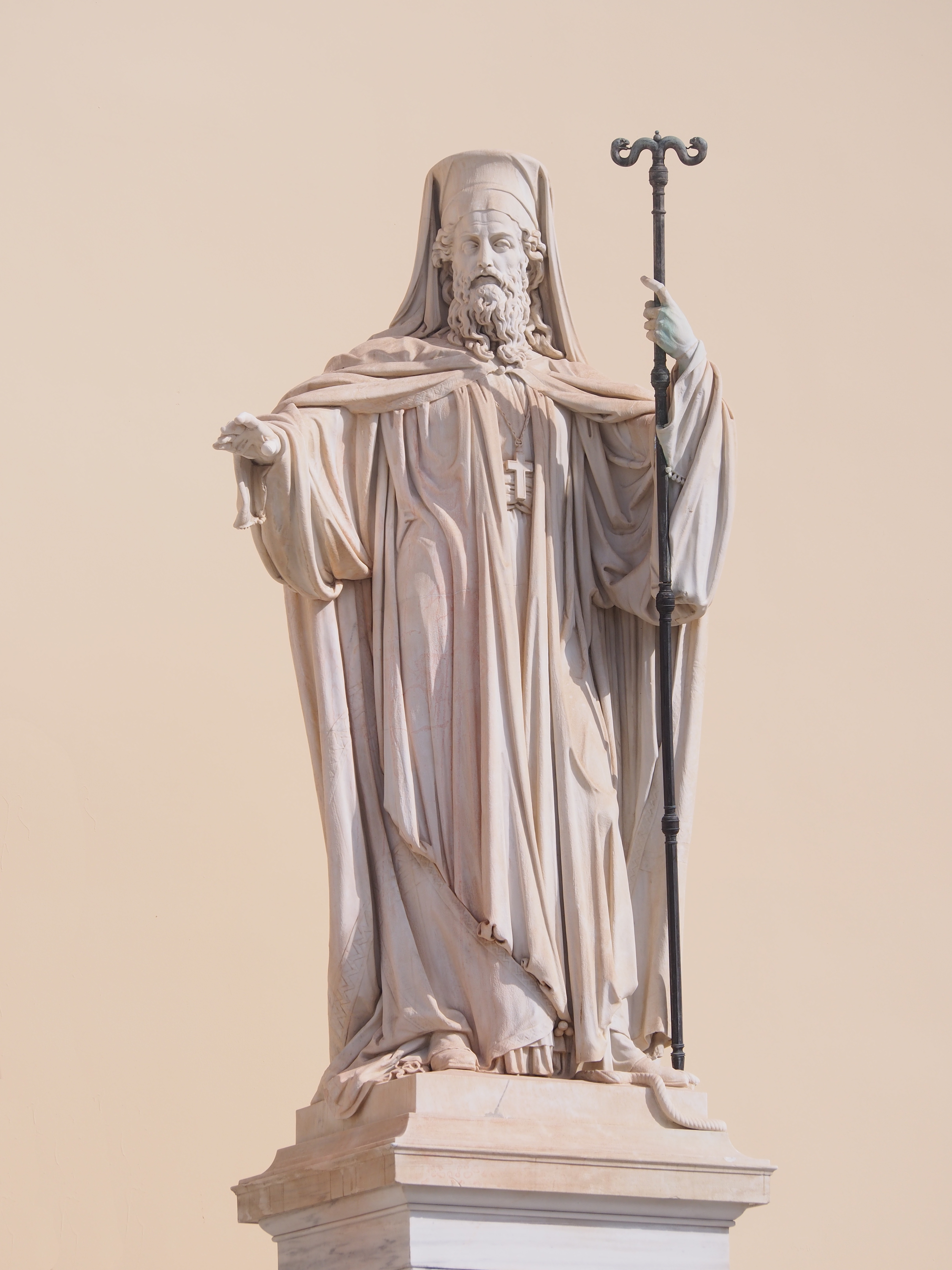
The statue of Patriarch Gregory V at the University of Athens

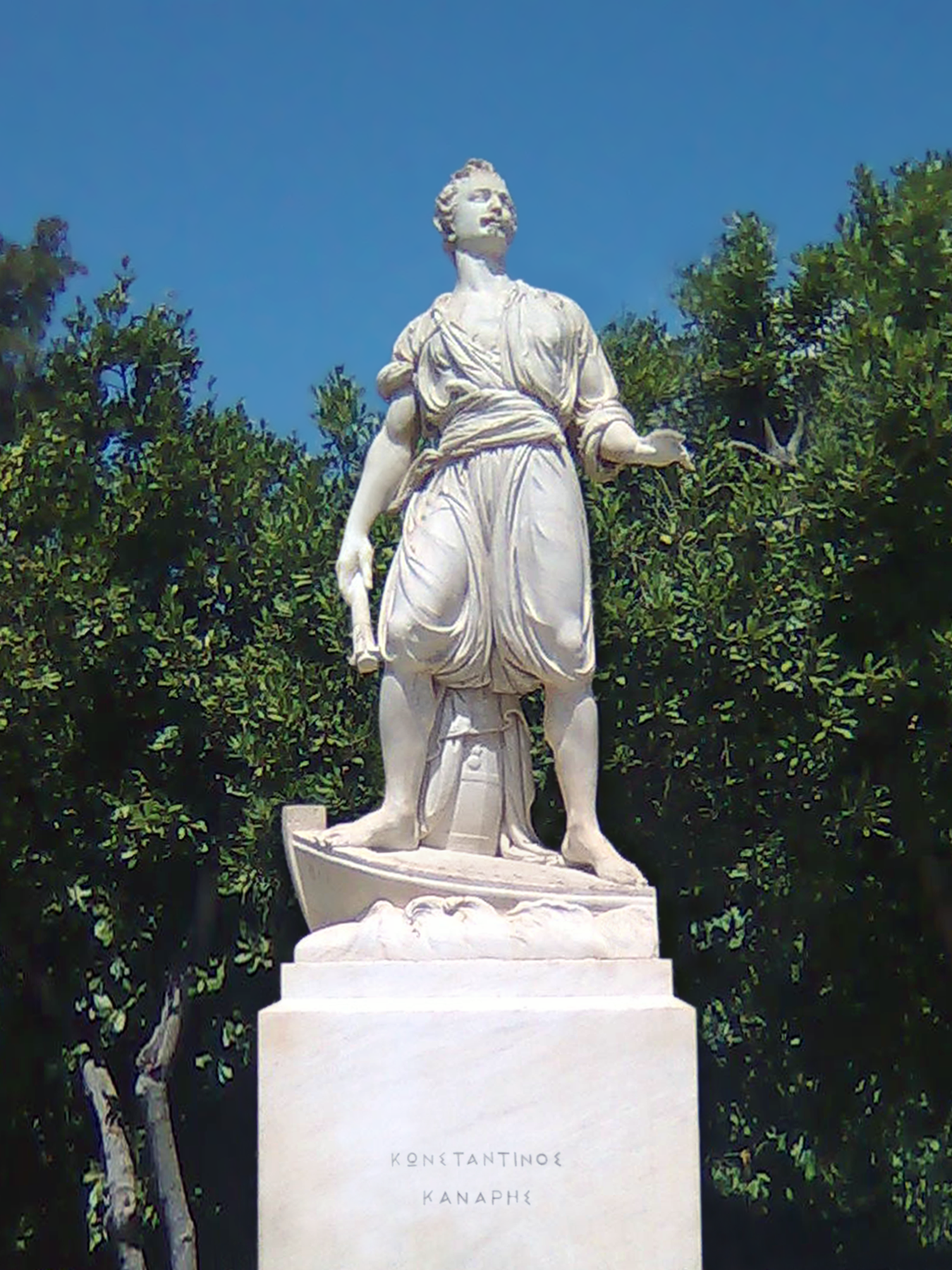
The statue of Konstantinos Kanaris in Kypseli, Athens
