= Karl Krazeisen =

German artist (1794–1878)

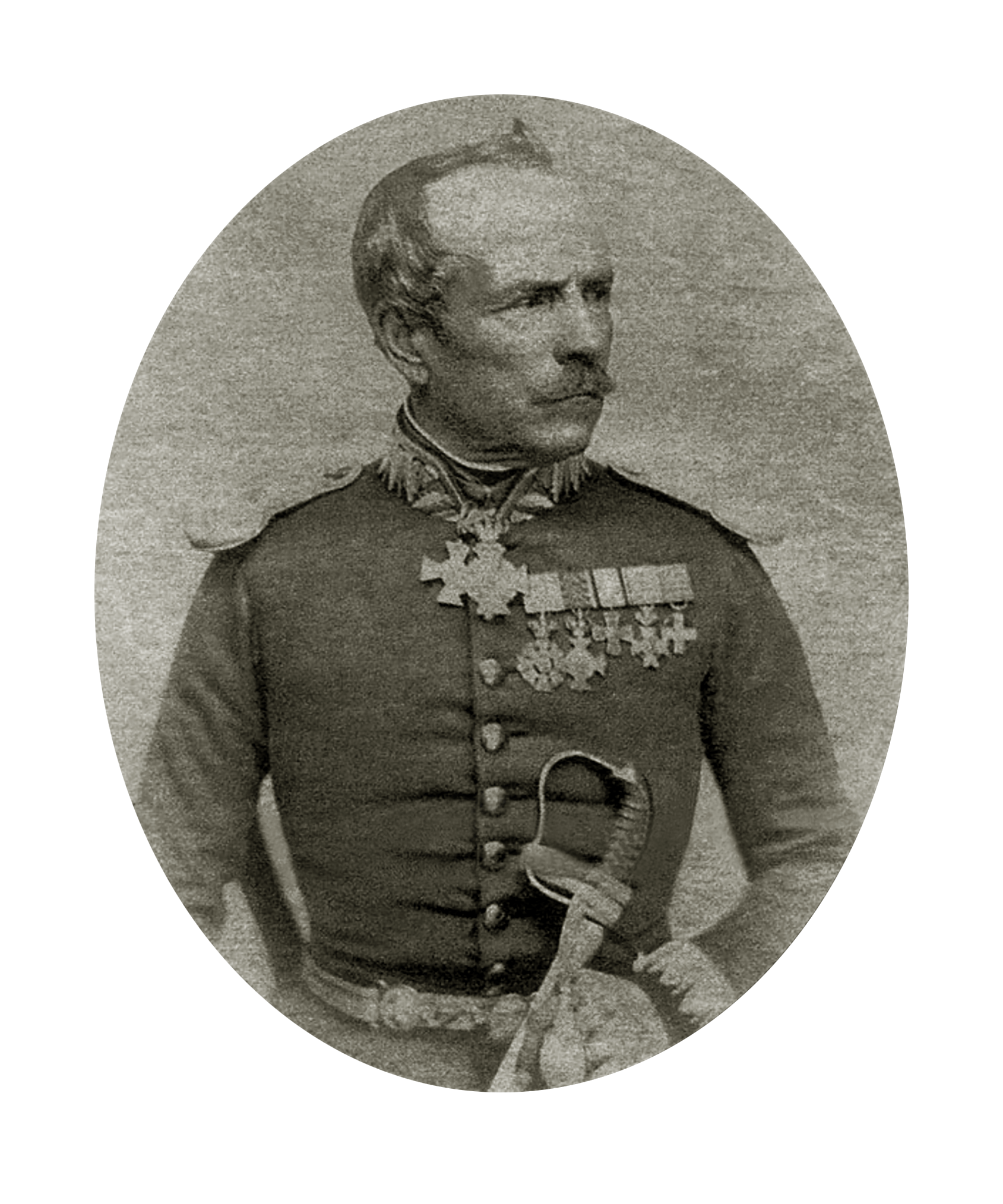
- Karl August Krazeisen
- Born: 28 October 1794; Kastellaun
- Died: 27 January 1878 (aged 83); Munich
- Known for: Soldier, philhellene and portraitist
- Awards: Order of the Redeemer

Karl August Krazeisen (28 October 1794 Kastellaun – 27 January 1878 Munich) was a Bavarian soldier, philhellene and portraitist.

== Biography ==
=== Military career ===
There is no information regarding Krazeisen's childhood. In 1812 he entered the Bavarian army and took part in the 1813/14 War of the Sixth Coalition. In 1826, having by then promoted to lieutenant, along with 11 other Bavarians he was sent to Greece, where the Greek War of Independence was going through a critical phase, after the troops of the Ottoman Sultan had received assistance from his vassal Muhammad Ali of Egypt. It was the first public action to support the Greek struggle, taken by another European state, as Bavarian King Ludwig I was an ardent philhellene.

Under the command of Charles Nicolas Fabvier, Krazeisen took part in the operations from November 1826 till April 1827 (Siege of the Acropolis and Battle of Phaleron).

On his return to Munich he was promoted to General of the Infantry.

=== Artist ===
Krazeisen was not a professional artist, but having the ability to draw, he used his stay in Greece to create portraits of the heroes of the war, the sketches of camps, costumes, uniforms, battle plans.

He returned to Munich in 1827, published his Greek album, which from 1828 to 1831 was republished seven times. His collection, made from life, represents the main pictorial archive of the personalities of the Greek War of Independence.

Subsequently Krazeisen was honoured by Greece with the Order of the Redeemer.

== Gallery ==
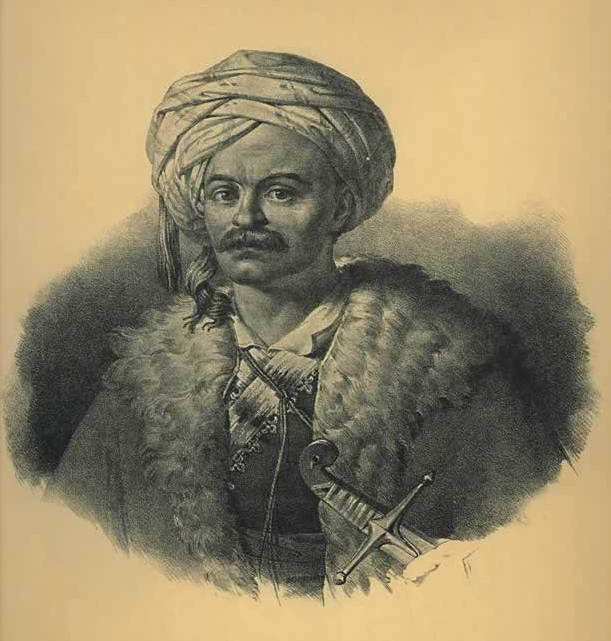
Charles Nicolas Fabvier

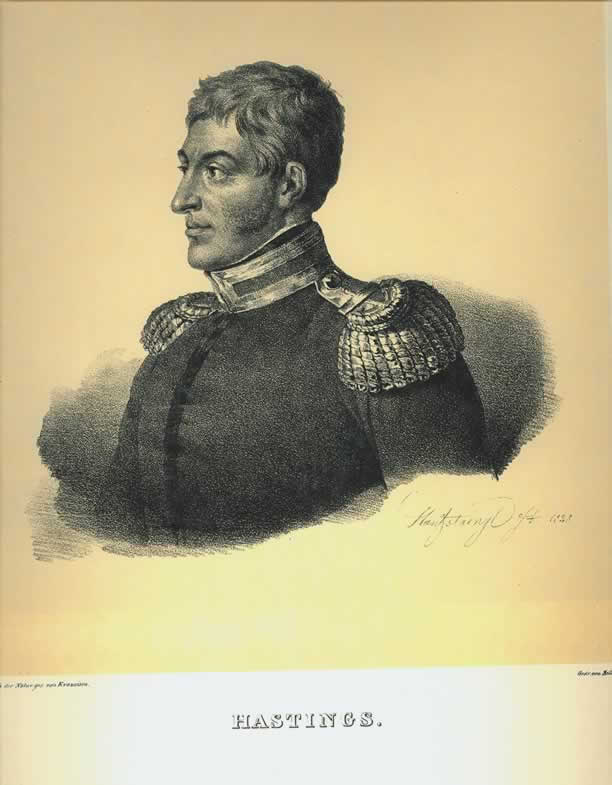
Frank Abney Hastings

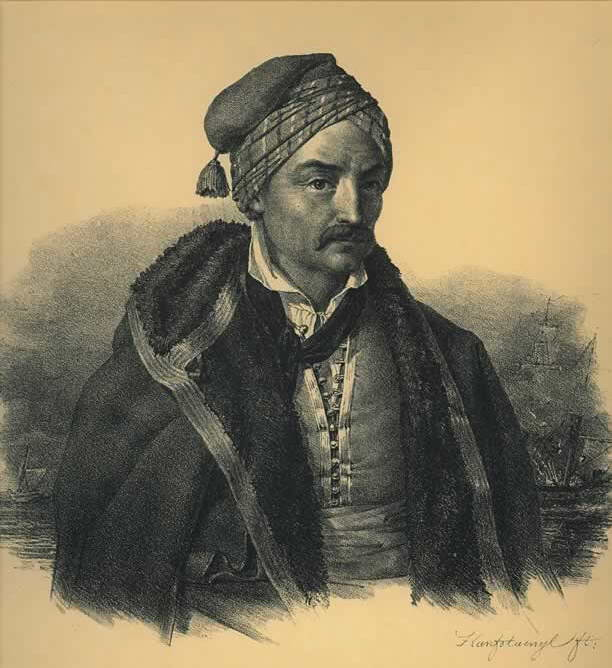
Konstantinos Kanaris

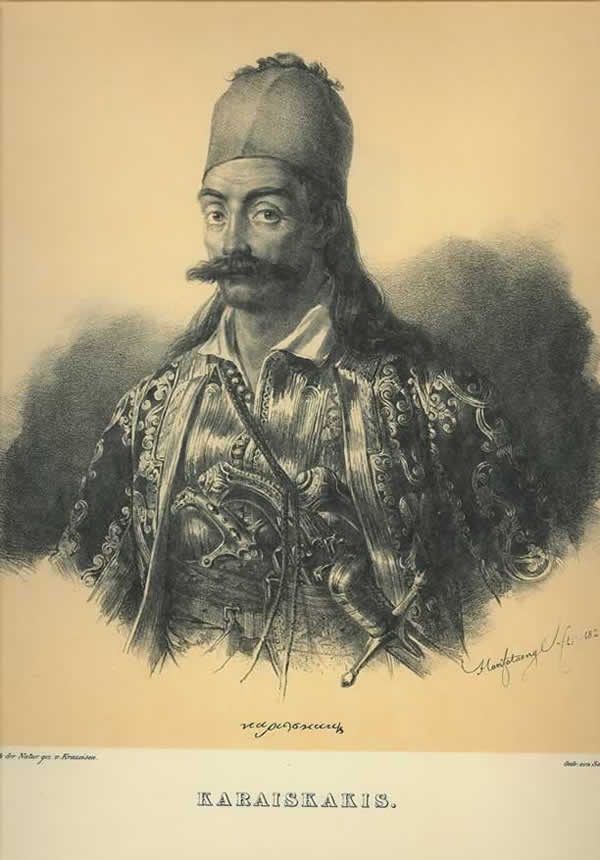
Georgios Karaiskakis

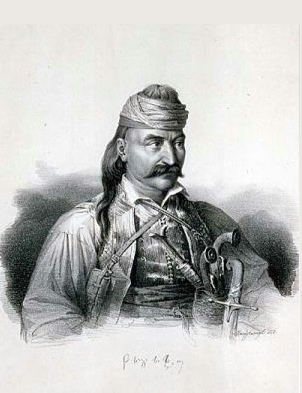
Theodoros Kolokotronis

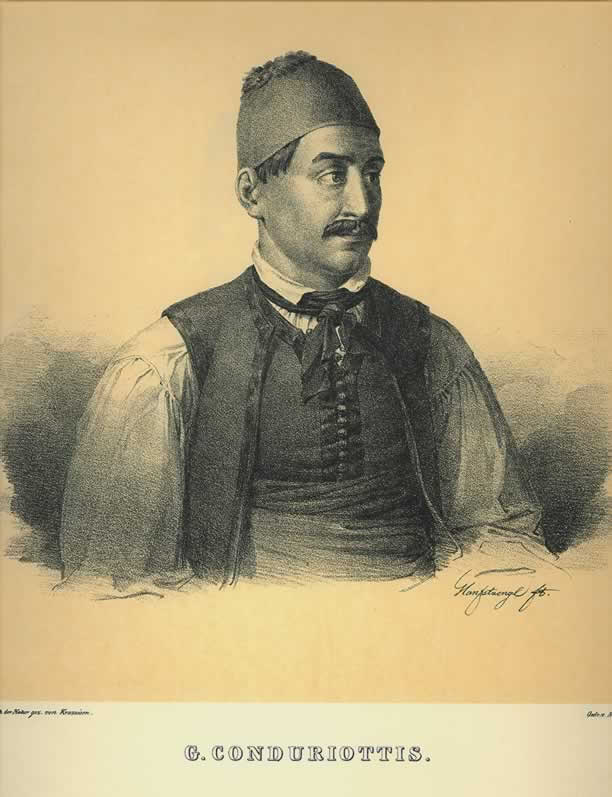
Georgios Kountouriotis

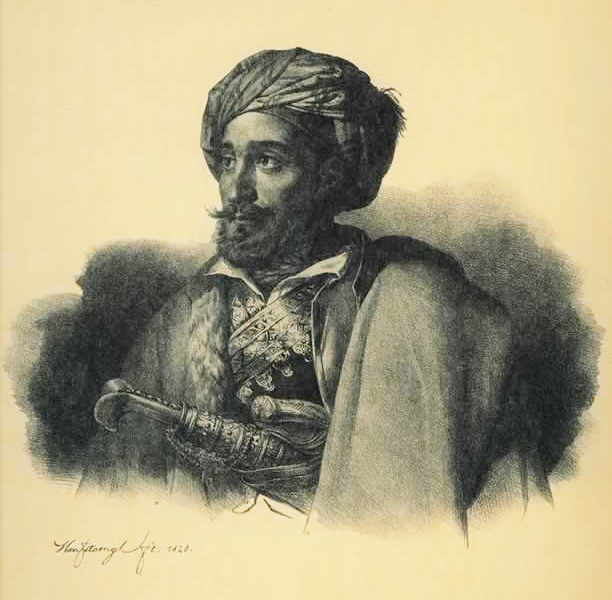
Ioannis Makrygiannis

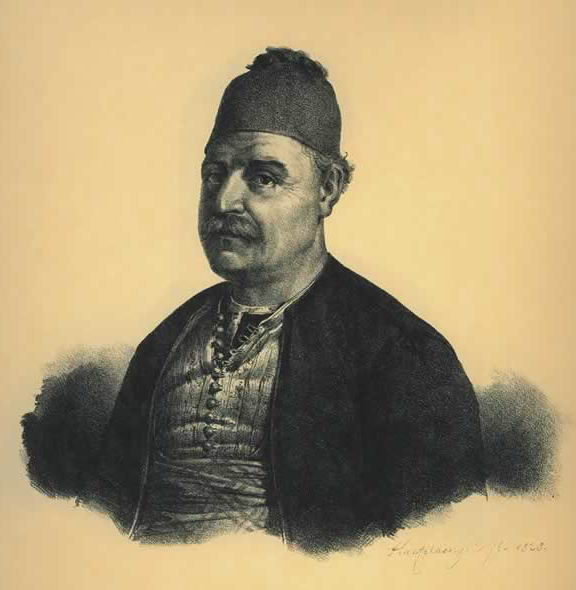
Andreas Vokos Miaoulis

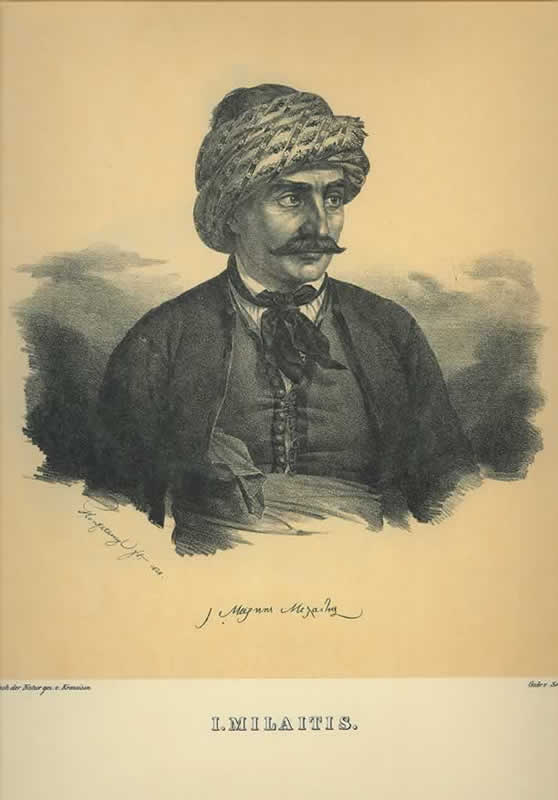
Ioannis Milaitis

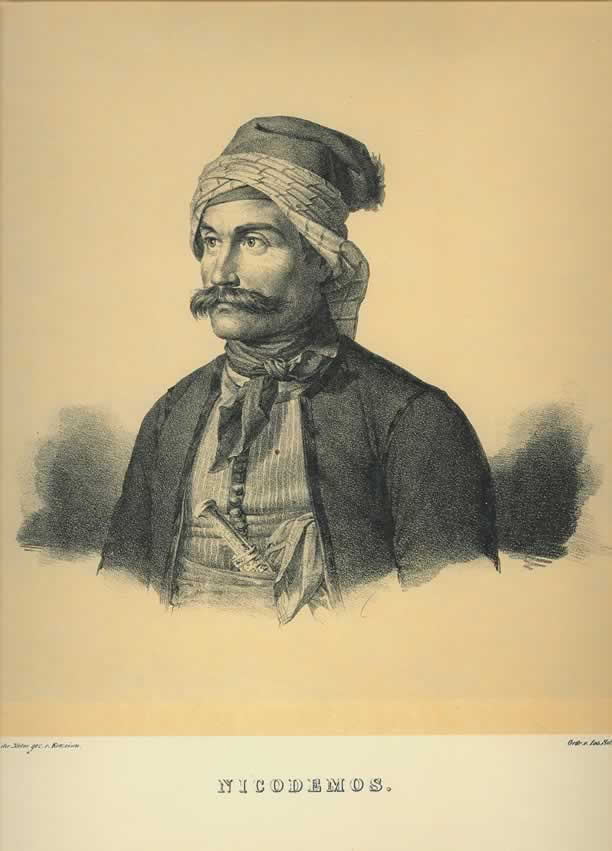
Konstantinos Nikodimos

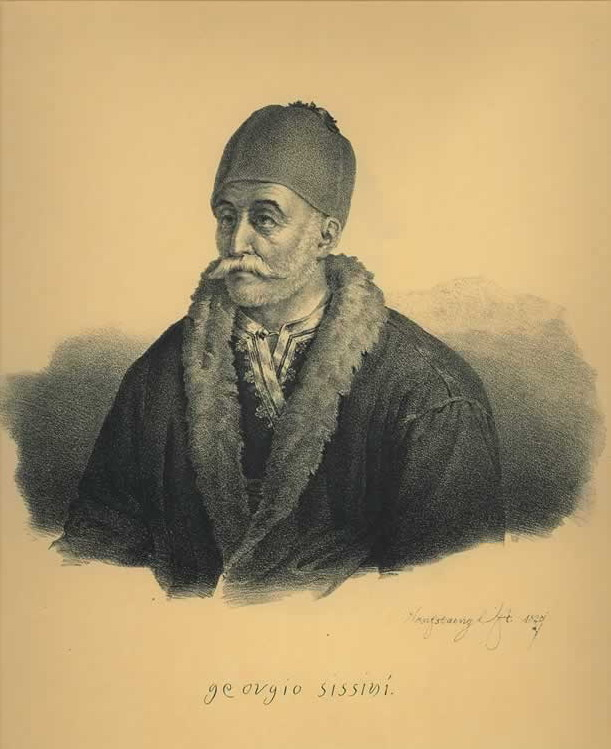
Georgios Sisinis

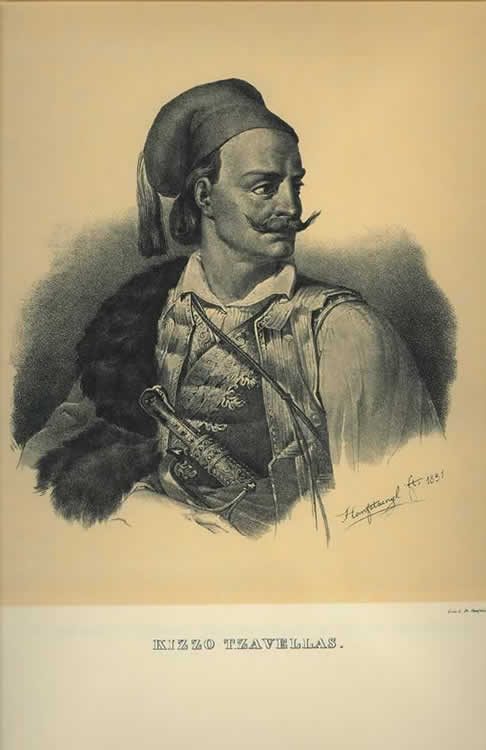
Kitsos Tzavelas

== Literature ==
- Hajo Knebel: EberhardKieser, Karl Krazeisen, Eduard Bäumer — drei Künstler aus Kastellaun in der Kunstgeschichte. — In: HunsrückerHeimatblätter. — 1989. p. 338—341. — 1989
- Georg Kaspar Nagler, Neues allgemeines Künstler-Lexicon 1839, p. 168

== See also ==
- Greek War of Independence
