= USS Stickell =

Gearing-class destroyer

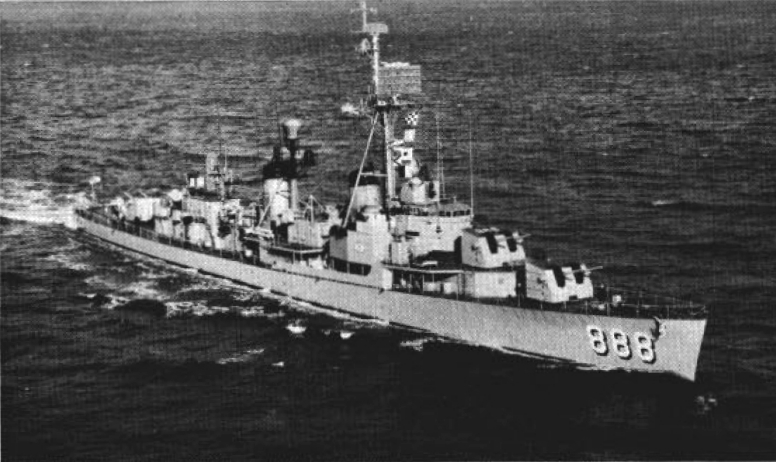
- USS Stickell (DD-888) underway in 1962

History

United States
- Name: USS Stickell
- Namesake: John H. Stickell
- Builder: Consolidated Steel Corporation, Orange, Texas
- Laid down: 5 January 1945
- Launched: 16 June 1945
- Commissioned: 31 October 1945
- Decommissioned: 13 December 1952
- Identification: Callsign: NBIK; Hull number: DD-888
- Reclassified: DDR-888, 1953
- Recommissioned: 2 September 1953
- Reclassified: DD-888, 1964
- Decommissioned: 1 July 1972
- Stricken: 1 July 1972
- Honors and awards: 6 battle stars (Korea); 1 battle star (Vietnam)
- Fate: Transferred to Greece, 1 July 1972
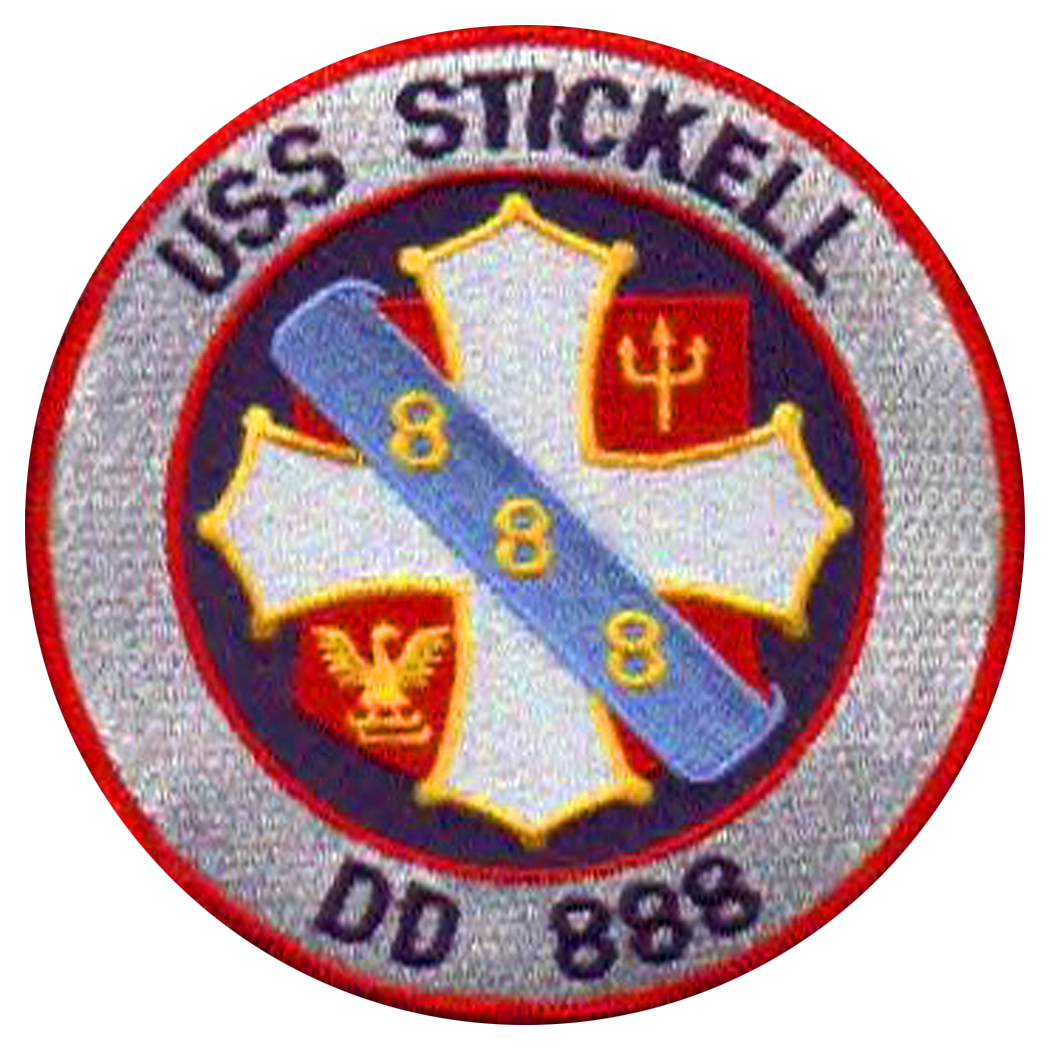
- Badge

Greece
- Name: HS Kanaris
- Namesake: Konstantinos Kanaris
- Acquired: 1 July 1972
- Commissioned: 1 July 1972
- Decommissioned: 15 September 1993
- Stricken: 1994
- Identification: D212
- Fate: Sold for scrap, 2002

General characteristics
- Class & type: Gearing-class destroyer
- Displacement: 2,425 long tons (2,464 t) standard; 3,520 long tons (3,576 t) full
- Length: 390 ft 6 in (119.02 m)
- Beam: 40 ft 10 in (12.45 m)
- Draft: 19 ft (5.8 m)
- Propulsion: 4 Babcock & Wilcox boilers; Geared steam turbines, 60,000 shp (45 MW); 2 shafts
- Speed: 33 knots (61 km/h; 38 mph)
- Range: 4,500 nmi (8,300 km) at 20 kn (37 km/h; 23 mph)
- Complement: 274
- Armament: As built : 6 × 5"/38 caliber guns (3×2); 12 × 40 mm AA guns; 10 × 21 inch (533 mm) torpedo tubes; 1 × depth charge track; After FRAM upgrade : 4 × 5"/38 caliber guns (2×2); 1 × MK112 eight cell ASROC launcher; 6 × 12.75 in (324 mm) torpedo tubes (2×3) for Mk44/Mk46 torpedoes; 1 × depth charge track; In Hellenic Navy service : 4 × 5"/38 caliber guns (2×2); 1 × MK112 eight cell ASROC launcher; 6 × 12.75 in (324 mm) torpedo tubes (2×3) for Mk44/Mk46 torpedoes; 1 × depth charge track; 1 × OTO Melara 76 mm/62 cal. DP gun (in floor of the helicopter deck, had separate fire control); 4 × RGM-84 Harpoon missiles (2×2) (in helicopter deck)
- Aircraft carried: 2 × QH-50 DASH helicopters (1963-1976)

USS Stickell (DD-888) was a Gearing-class destroyer of the United States Navy in service from 1945 to 1972. She was renamed HS Kanaris (D212) (Greek: Φ/Γ Κανάρης) in 1972 on transfer to the Hellenic Navy.

== Service history ==
=== 1945–1950 ===
Stickell (DD-888) was named for Lieutenant John H. Stickell USNR (1914–1943), who was killed in action at Jaluit Atoll in the Marshall Islands on 13 December 1943 and posthumously awarded the Navy Cross. She was laid down on 5 January 1945 at Orange, Texas, by the Consolidated Steel Corporation; launched on 16 June 1945; sponsored by Miss Sue Stickell; and commissioned on 31 October 1945.

Assigned to the Atlantic Fleet, Stickell operated under Commander, Amphibious Training, Galveston, Texas, for a month, 10 December 1945 to 11 January 1946. She then conducted shakedown training out of Guantánamo Bay, Cuba, before arriving in Charleston, South Carolina, on 11 March for post-shakedown availability. She shifted to Norfolk, Virginia, on 21 April and, until 6 May, supported carrier qualifications from that port with Kearsarge (CV-33). She then screened Kearsarge to Guantanamo Bay and, from there, to the Panama Canal. She returned to Norfolk on 13 June. Two days later, she got underway for the west coast. Heading via the Panama Canal, she reached San Diego, California, on 29 June and joined Destroyer Division (DesDiv) 11. Over the next four and one-half years, Stickell made three cruises to the Far East to serve with the 7th Fleet. During these deployments, she visited the Philippines, the Marianas, Japan, North and South Korea, China, and Okinawa. After each tour of duty in the western Pacific, she returned to duty along the west coast and in Hawaiian waters. Drills and exercises occupied the bulk of her time during the postwar period.

=== Korea, 1950–1952 ===
On 6 November 1950, Stickell completed overhaul at Mare Island Naval Shipyard and sailed for the Korean War Zone with DesDiv 52. She made Sasebo, Japan, on 27 November and, three days later, joined the screen of Task Force (TF) 77. The destroyer's first Korean War tour lasted until 20 July 1951. During that deployment, she operated with the fast carriers off the southern and eastern coasts of Korea, participated in anti-submarine warfare exercises off Yokosuka, Japan, conducted shore bombardments of the Songjin-Wonsan area and patrolled the waters off Shingjin, Yong-do, and Chongjin for enemy small craft. In addition, she landed Republic of Korea intelligence teams on hostile shores: and she rescued three air crewmen while on lifeguard duty for the carriers. On 20 July 1951, she headed east toward the United States and arrived in San Diego, California, on 4 August.

For almost seven months, Stickell remained on the west coast, conducting training operations out of San Diego. On 26 January 1952, she put to sea for the Far East once again. After stopping at Yokosuka from 19 to 23 February, she began her second combat tour in Korean waters. Between 23 February and 19 March, she operated with TF 77 off the coast of Korea and made three shore bombardments; one off Yong-do on 28 February with heavy cruiser Rochester; one at the bombline on 5 March; and one off Singchong-Ni on 11 March with the cruiser Saint Paul. On 19 March, Stickell and the rest of DesDiv 52 joined the United Nations blockading and escort force, Task Group (TG) 95.2. As the bombardment and patrol element, Stickell not only blockaded Hŭngnam, but also delivered interdiction and shore bombardment fire.

After bombarding Wonsan Harbor on 31 March, she rejoined TF 77 on 1 April and retired with that force to Yokosuka. She remained at Yokosuka during the first two weeks in April; then resumed support for TF 77 air strikes and intermittent shore bombardments. She was in Yokosuka from 29 May to 18 June for dry-docking and repairs before conducting a brief operation along Korea's east coast, including a night landing in the vicinity of Pohang Dong. Stickell cleared the area on 23 June with DesDiv 52 for exercises out of Buckner Bay, Okinawa. The division returned to Yokosuka on 5 July and, the next day, was underway again to visit Hong Kong and to patrol the Taiwan Strait. She rendezvoused with Carrier Division 3 on 14 July and, with TG 50.3, conducted operations in the Philippines and in the South China Sea, before returning to the Taiwan area to rejoin TF 77 on 27 July. After further operations off the eastern coast of Korea, she entered Yokosuka on 6 August and, four days later, sailed for return to the United States.

=== 1953–1962 ===
Stickell arrived in San Diego on 26 August and remained there until 13 December, when she was decommissioned at Long Beach to begin conversion to a radar picket destroyer (DDR). On 2 September 1953, Stickell (DDR-888) was recommissioned at Long Beach. Following training out of Long Beach, she joined DesDiv 21 at San Diego on 18 January 1954. Two days later, she and her division headed for the western Pacific. This deployment consisted primarily of hunter-killer training and Taiwan Strait patrol. On 1 June, she departed Sasebo on a voyage to complete a circumnavigation of the globe. Along the way, she visited Hong Kong, Singapore, Ceylon, Kenya, South Africa, Brazil, and Trinidad, She reached Norfolk, Virginia, on 10 August 1954 and joined DesDiv 262 of the Atlantic Fleet.

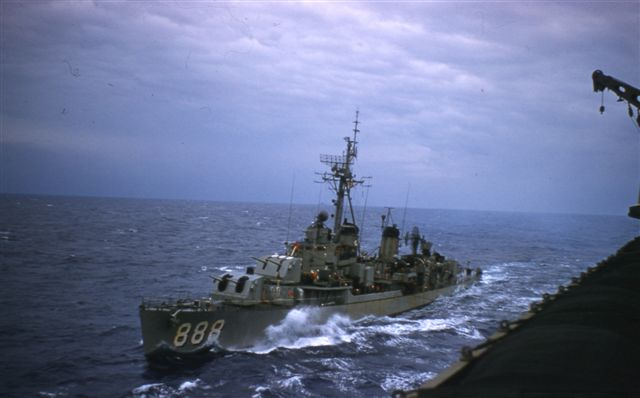
USS Stickell in 1958. She was assigned to the battle group of the aircraft carrier USS Franklin D. Roosevelt, from which this photo was taken.

For the next nine years, Stickell served the Atlantic Fleet as a radar destroyer. Between 1954 and 1958, she went through two complete training cycles, including yard overhauls, Mediterranean deployments, refresher training, and NATO and Atlantic Fleet exercises. She received the latest in electronic equipment during her 1958 overhaul; and, soon thereafter, she was outfitted with an experimental data processing and weapons analysis system. In 1961, she earned the Atlantic Fleet Destroyer force Antiair Warfare Trophy. Her seven-month Mediterranean cruise in 1962 was highlighted by an excursion into the Black Sea. In the fall of 1962, Stickell participated in the Cuban Quarantine and showed great efficiency by departing Norfolk on very short notice to assume her station.

=== 1963–1965 ===
In May 1963, she entered the Philadelphia Naval Shipyard for a Fleet Rehabilitation and Modernization (FRAM) overhaul. Stickell surrendered her anti-aircraft warfare electronics equipment in return for the latest in ASW gear, including ASROC missiles and DASH drone helicopters. Early in 1964, she rejoined the Atlantic Fleet in Destroyer Squadron (DesRon) 12 as a straight DD. Home ported at Newport, Rhode Island, she became the flagship of DesDiv 122. Following refresher training in April, she became a unit of the midshipman training squadron and made a cruise to northern European ports in June and July. From August to November, she served with the Atlantic Anti-submarine Warfare Forces; then she deployed to the Mediterranean until March 1965.

She returned to Newport and, in April, shifted to Norfolk to complete her DASH outfitting. In June, Stickell joined TF 124, in supporting United States and other OAS forces operating in the Dominican Republic during the 1965 upheavals in that country. After five weeks of patrolling, she entered the Bethlehem Shipbuilding Corporation shipyard at Boston, Massachusetts, for a six-week overhaul. In October, she took station off the west coast of Africa to participate in the recovery of Gemini 6. However, the mission was scrubbed, and Stickell returned, via Martinique, to Newport. In November and early December, she participated in amphibious exercises at Vieques Island, near Puerto Rico; then returned to Newport.

=== Vietnam, 1966 ===
On 19 January 1966, Stickell, along with the other units of Destroyer Squadron 12, departed Newport for duty with the 7th Fleet in the Far East. After transiting the Panama Canal and brief stops at San Diego and Pearl Harbor, the ship commenced wartime operations in the South China Sea in support of the Republic of Vietnam. While attached to the 7th Fleet, Stickell was assigned to Search and Rescue (SAR) and helicopter inflight refueling duties in the Gulf of Tonkin; plane guarding for various attack carriers, especially Ranger; and gunfire support duties. During the deployment, the ship visited the following Far East ports: Kaohsiung, Formosa; Yokosuka, Japan; Subic Bay, Philippines; Hong Kong; route back to Newport — completely circumnavigating the world — crossing the equator near Indonesia. After the Stickell visited Port Dickson, Malaysia; Cochin, India; and Aden. She transited the Suez Canal and touched at Athens, Greece; Palma, Mallorca; and Gibraltar. ship returned to Newport on 17 August 1966.

=== 1966–1968 ===
In October 1966, Stickell entered the Boston Naval Shipyard for overhaul. She emerged in February 1967 and steamed to Guantánamo Bay for refresher training. Stickell then headed for Culebra Island where she qualified as a naval gunfire support ship. After a short inport period, Stickell deployed on a four-month ASW cruise. During the northern European segment of the cruise, Stickell visited Bergen, Norway; Aarhus, Denmark; Sundsvall, Sweden; and Thurso, Scotland. She operated with ships and aircraft from the navies of Norway, Denmark, West Germany, Great Britain, and France. Stickell then entered the Mediterranean Sea and joined the 6th Fleet. She operated with the aircraft carrier Essex and several other destroyers as a "pouncer" ASW Task Force. While in the Mediterranean, Stickell visited Naples, Italy; Valletta, Malta; and Palermo, Sicily. On 19 September 1967, she steamed past Brenton Reef Light and was home again.

Before the end of the year, Stickell participated in two ASW exercises. The first, "Canus Silex," a combined Canadian-United States ASW exercise and the second, "Fixwex India." By February 1968, Stickell was preparing for a visit to the Caribbean and her part in "Springboard 68." After leaving frozen Newport behind, Stickell participated in a variety of training operations designed to sharpen her crew's already finely honed efficiency. Following "Springboard", she acted as sonar training ship at the Fleet Antisubmarine Warfare School at Key West, Florida.

The next several months were spent preparing for Stickell's next deployment. On 2 July 1968, Stickell left Newport for a six-month, 13-nation cruise of the Indian Ocean as part of the Navy's Middle East Force. She visited San Juan, Puerto Rico; Recife, Brazil; Luanda, Angola; Lourenço Marques, Mozambique; Port Louis, Mauritius; Cochin, India; Karachi, Pakistan; Bahrain; Massawa, Ethiopia; Mombasa, Kenya; Assab, Ethiopia; Bandar Abbas, Iran; Bushehr, Iran; Kuwait; and Dakar, Senegal — touching some ports more than once. While in the Persian Gulf area, Stickell participated in the international naval exercise "Middlinx XL". Together with units of the United States, British, and Iranian navies, Stickell once again demonstrated her readiness in the fields of anti-submarine and anti-aircraft warfare. Stickell returned home on 10 January 1969.

=== 1969–1972 ===
Over the next three years, Stickell alternated deployments with operations off the east coast of the United States and in the Caribbean Sea. She was deployed to the Mediterranean again from September 1969 until late March 1970, when she returned to Norfolk, After post-deployment leave and upkeep, she headed to Davisville, Rhode Island, on 18 May for a month of hull repairs. Back in Norfolk again on 20 June, she remained there, except for two brief operations with the aircraft carrier John F. Kennedy in July, until 9 November when she got underway to off-load ammunition at Yorktown, in preparation for drydocking at Newport News, Virginia, from 13 November until 7 December. For the remainder of the year, she prepared for deployment to the Indian Ocean. Her second deployment with the Middle Eastern Force began on 7 January 1971, when she put to sea from Norfolk and ended on 29 June, upon her return to Norfolk. In the meantime, she visited ports in Brazil, Angola, Mozambique, Madagascar, Mauritius, Bahrein, Saudi Arabia, Ethiopia, Iran, India, Pakistan, Kenya, and Senegal.

At the end of this, her last, deployment, Stickell remained in the Virginia Capes area - for the most part at anchor or in port. She spent most of the remainder of 1971 and the first half of 1972 preparing for decommissioning and transfers to the government of Greece. On 1 July 1972, Stickell was decommissioned and struck from the Navy list. Immediately thereafter, the Greek Navy took possession of her and recommissioned her as Kanaris.

== Greek service ==
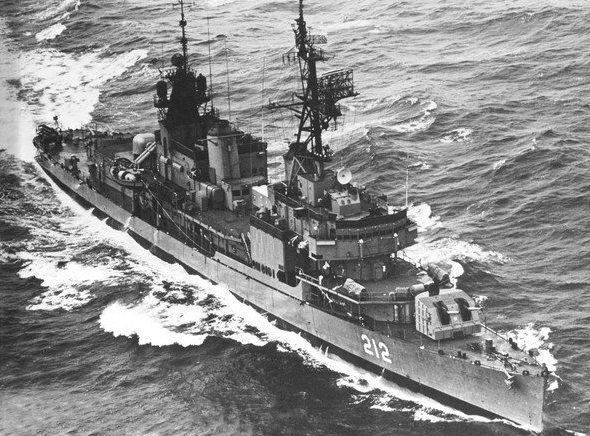
HS Kanaris (Φ/Γ Κανάρης) in 1988.

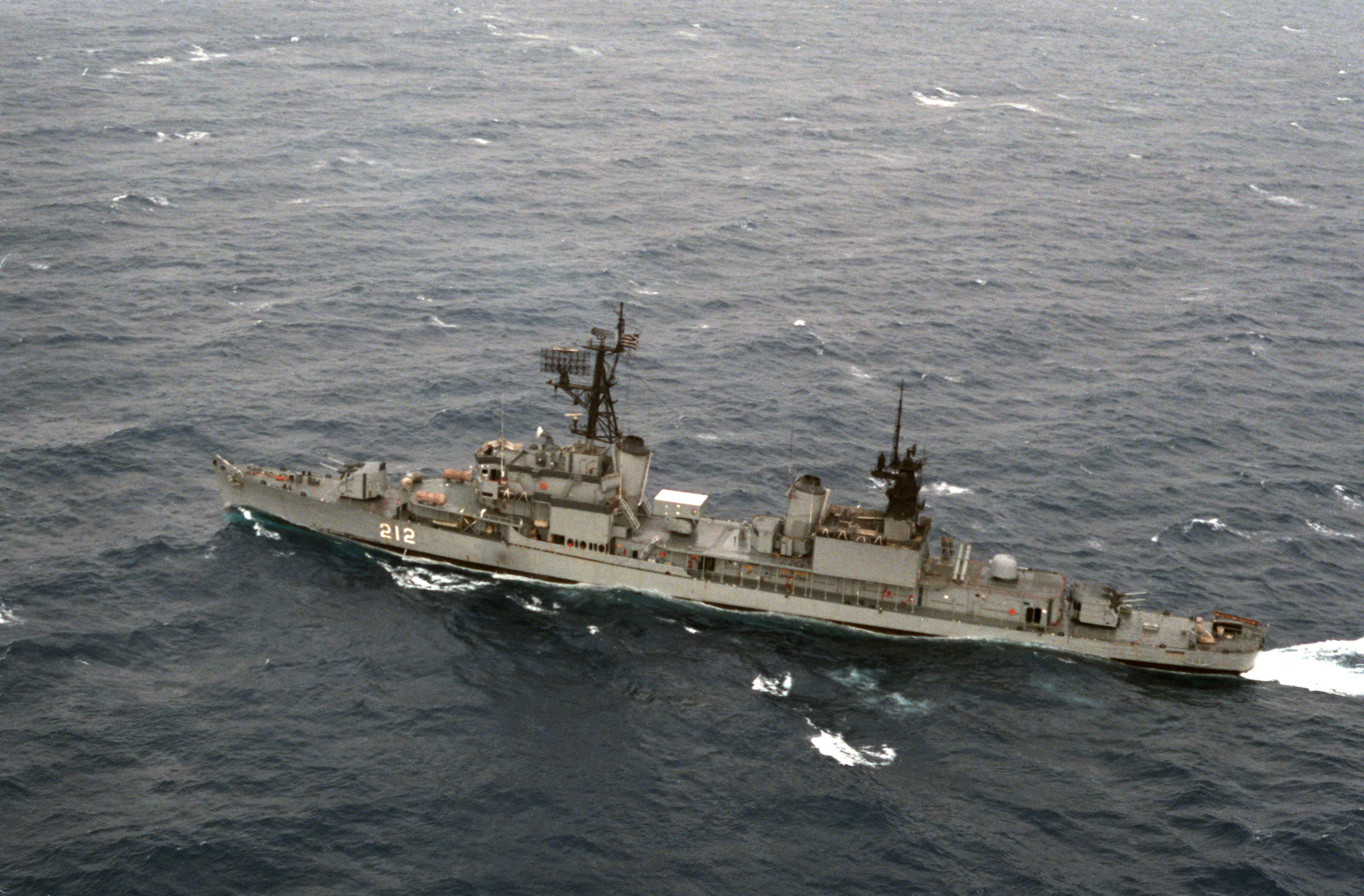
HS Kanaris (Φ/Γ Κανάρης) in 1988.

HS Kanaris (D212) (Greek: Φ/Γ Κανάρης) was named after Admiral Konstantinos Kanaris (1793–1877), a hero of the Greek War of Independence and later Prime Minister of Greece.

She was commissioned into the Hellenic Navy on 1 July 1972 at Norfolk, Virginia, by Cdr. K. Zografos HN. After sea trials and training she sailed to Greece where she arrived on 29 March 1973. She served in the Hellenic Navy for 20 years as part of the Destroyers Command Force. She performed many patrols in the Aegean Sea participated in Greek and NATO exercises and had active participation in the conflicts with Turkey in 1974 and 1987.

The ship's badge depicts the hand of a fire ship captain holding the torch used to set on fire the fire ship, while the fireship sails toward an Ottoman flagship during Greek War of Independence, the same badge used for the later frigate bearing the same name.

She was decommissioned on 15 September 1993, and sold for scrap in 2002.

== Awards ==
Stickell (DD-888) earned six battle stars for Korean War service and one for service in the Vietnam War.

== See also ==
- Gearing-class destroyer
- Konstantinos Kanaris
- United States Navy
- Hellenic Navy
