= Kanaris family =

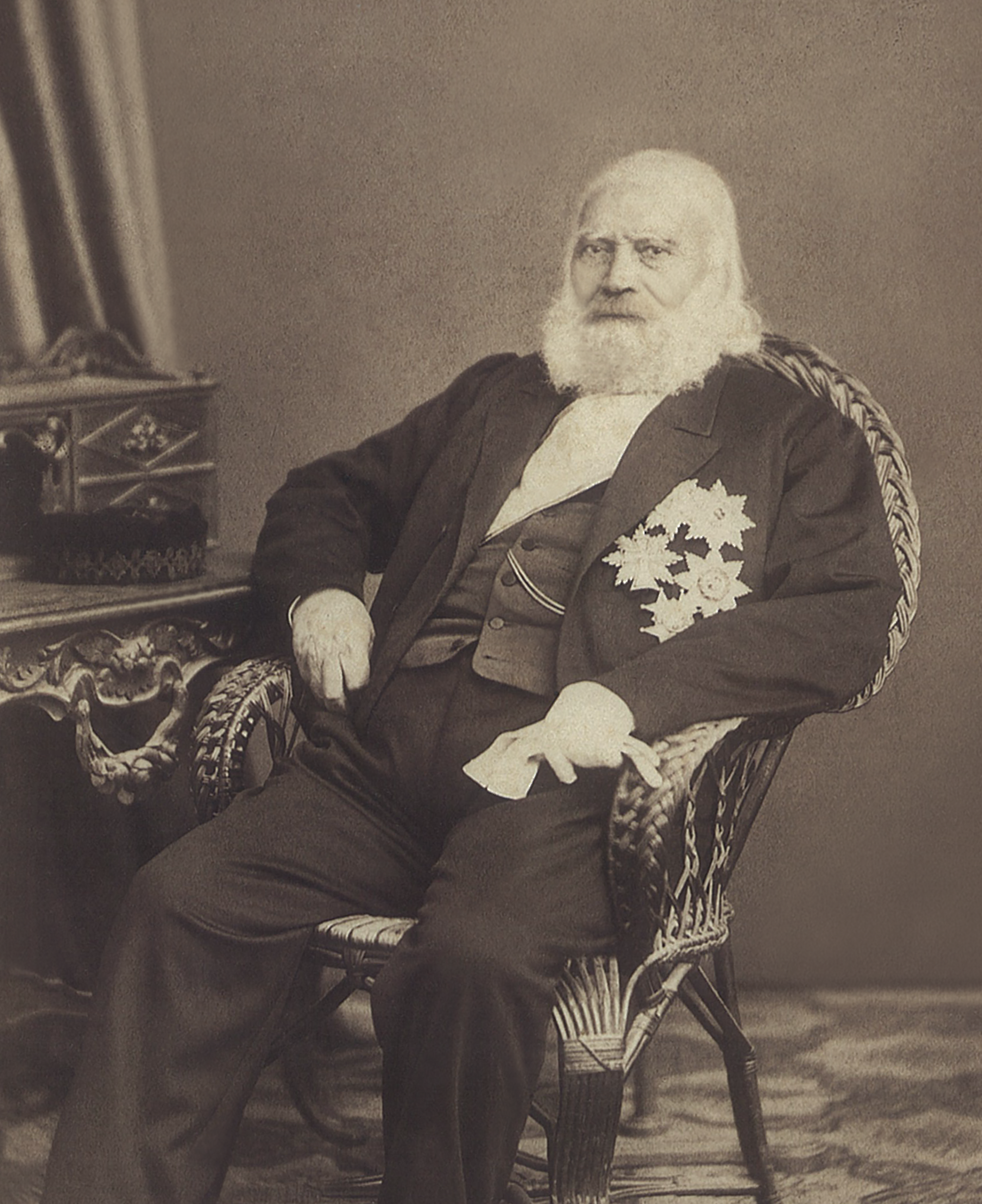
Konstantinos Kanaris, admiral and Prime Minister of Greece.

Flag of Psara.

The Kanaris family (Greek: Κανάρης) is a prominent family of sailors, politicians and soldiers from the island of Psara in Greece. The most important member of this family was the Greek admiral and statesman Konstantinos Kanaris.

== Members ==
Members of this family include:

- Mikes Kanaris, sailor and elder in Psara

- George Kanaris, naval officer and son of Mikes
- Konstantinos Kanaris, hero of the Greek War of Independence, admiral, Prime Minister and son of Mikes

- Nikolaos Kanaris, diplomat, Member of Parliament and son of Konstantinos
- Themistoklis Kanaris, army officer and son of Konstantinos
- Thrasyvoulos Kanaris, lieutenant and son of Konstantinos
- Miltiadis Kanaris, admiral, Member of Parliament, minister and son of Konstantinos

- Konstantinos Kanaris, naval officer and son of Miltiadis
- Leonidas Kanaris, lieutenant and son of Miltiadis
- Epaminondas Kanaris, Member of Parliament and son of Miltiadis
- Alexandros Kanaris, Member of Parliament, minister and son of Miltiadis
- Aristidis Kanaris, lieutenant general, and son of Miltiadis

- Maria Kanaris, wife of A. Balabano and daughter of Konstantinos
- Lykourgos Kanaris, naval officer, lawyer and son of Konstantinos

- Athena Kanaris, wife of Pierre-André Mihière and daughter of Lykourgos

- Napoleon Kanaris, Member of Parliament and son of Lykourgos

- Maria Kanaris, daughter of Napoleon

- Erasmia Kanaris, wife of Georgios Botasis and daughter of Maria

- Aristeidis Kanaris, army officer and son of Konstantinos

- Themistoklis Kanaris, consul, Member of Parliament, collaborator of Charilaos Trikoupis and son of Aristeidis
- Ioannis Kanaris, Member of Parliament and son of Aristeidis

== See also ==
- List of political families in Greece
- List of prime ministers of Greece
