= Greek destroyer Kanaris (L53) =

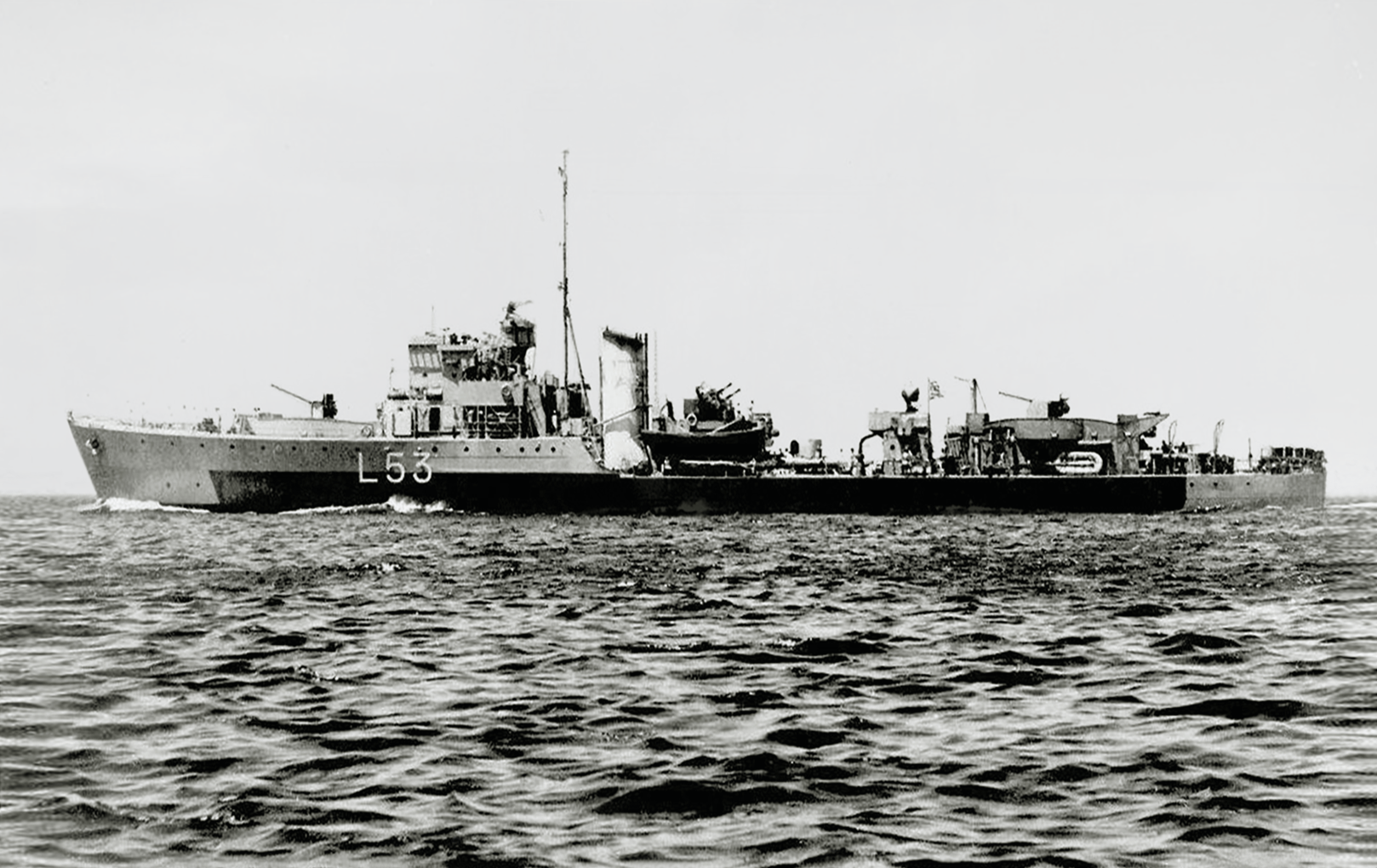
- RHS Kanaris (L53)

History

United Kingdom
- Name: HMS Hatherleigh
- Builder: Vickers-Armstrongs, High Walker
- Laid down: 12 December 1940
- Launched: 18 December 1941

Greece
- Name: RHS Kanaris - ΒΠ Κανάρης
- Namesake: Konstantinos Kanaris
- Commissioned: 27 July 1942
- Decommissioned: 1959
- Identification: Pennant number: L53
- Fate: Returned to UK and sold for scrap in 1960

General characteristics
- Class & type: Type III Hunt-class destroyer
- Displacement: Full load 1,490 tons; Standard 1,050 tons
- Length: 85.3 m (280 ft)
- Beam: 11.4 m (37 ft)
- Draft: 2.4 m (7 ft 10 in)
- Propulsion: Boilers: 2 Admiralty 3 drum boilers, Engines: 2 shaft Parsons turbine, Shafts: 2 (twin screw ship), Power: 19,000 shp, (14.2 MW)
- Speed: 26-knot (48 km/h) maximum; 20-knot (37 km/h) maximum operational
- Range: 2,350 nautical miles (4,350 km) at 20.0 knots (37 km/h)
- Complement: 170
- Armament: 4 × 4-inch (102 mm) (2 × 2) guns, one 4 × 40 mm A/A QF 2-pounder "pom-pom" gun, 3 × 20 mm A/A, 2 × 21-inch (533 mm) T/T, one depth charge track

RHS Kanaris (L53) (Greek: ΒΠ Κανάρης) was a Type III Hunt-class destroyer that was originally built for the British Royal Navy as HMS Hatherleigh.

== General characteristics ==
The Hunt class was meant to fill the Royal Navy's need for a large number of small destroyer-type vessels capable of both convoy escort and operations with the fleet. The Type III Hunts differed from the previous Type II ships in replacing a twin 4-inch gun mount by two torpedo tubes to improve their ability to operate as destroyers.

The ship was 85.3 m (280 ft) long, her beam was 11.4 m (37 ft) and draught 2.4 m (7 ft 10 in). Displacement was 1,050 long tons (1,070 t) standard and 1,490 long tons (1,510 t) under full load. Two Admiralty boilers raising steam at 300 pounds per square inch (2,100 kPa) and 620 °F (327 °C) fed Parsons single-reduction geared steam turbines that drove two propeller shafts, generating 19,000 shaft horsepower (14,000 kW) at 380 rpm. This gave a speed of 26 knots (48 km/h; 30 mph) and a range of 2,350 nautical miles (4,350 km; 2,700 mi) at 20 knots (37 km/h; 23 mph).

Her main gun armament included four 4-inch (102 mm) QF Mk XVI guns (anti-ship and anti-aircraft) in two twin mounts, with a quadruple 2-pounder "pom-pom" gun and three Oerlikon 20 mm cannons providing close-in anti-aircraft fire. The ship's anti-aircraft armament may have been supplemented by two Bofors 40 mm guns. Two 21-inch (533 mm) torpedo tubes were fitted in a single twin mount, while two depth charge chutes, four depth charge throwers and 70 depth charges comprised the ship's anti-submarine armament. Type 291 and Type 285 radars was fitted, as was a Type 128 sonar.

== Service ==
The ship was laid down at the shipyard of Vickers-Armstrongs, High Walker, on 12 December 1940. Before her completion, she was transferred to the Royal Hellenic Navy and commissioned on 27 July 1942, in order to relieve heavy losses of ships sustained by Greece during the German invasion of 1941. She was named after Admiral Konstantinos Kanaris, hero of the Greek War of Independence, and later Prime Minister of Greece. She served throughout the Second World War and during the Greek Civil War. In 1959, she was returned to the Royal Navy and broken up for scrap in 1960.

== See also ==
- Konstantinos Kanaris
- Royal Navy
- Hellenic Navy
- Hunt-class destroyer

== Bibliography ==
- Blackman, Raymond V. B., ed. (1963). Jane's Fighting Ships 1963–64. London: Sampson Low, Marston & Co. OCLC 815472274.
- English, John (1987). The Hunts: a history of the design, development and careers of the 86 destroyers of this class built for the Royal and Allied Navies during World War II. Kendal, UK: World Ship Society. ISBN 0-905617-44-4.
- Lenton, H.T. (1970). Navies of the Second World War: British Fleet & Escort Destroyers Volume Two. London: Macdonald & Co. ISBN 0-356-03122-5.
