= Aristeidis Kanaris =

- Αριστείδης Κανάρης

Officer in the Greek Army
- In office 1858–1863

Personal details
- Born: 1831
- Died: 19 June 1863 (aged 31–32) Athens, Kingdom of Greece
- Parent: Konstantinos Kanaris (father)
- Education: Evelpidon Military Academy
- Profession: Officer and politician

Aristeidis Kanaris (Greek: Αριστείδης Κανάρης, 1831 – 19 June 1863) was an officer in the Greek Army and son of Konstantinos Kanaris, fighter of the Greek War of Independence and politician. He was killed during the civil conflict of 1863 known as Iouniana.

== Biography ==
Aristeidis Kanaris was born in 1831 and he was the sixth out of seven children of Konstantinos Kanaris and Despoina Maniati. He entered the Evelpidon Military Academy from which he graduated in 1858 as an officer in the Artillery.

During June 1863 a government crisis broke out with armed conflicts between two different political factions, the so-called "Mountain" and "Plain" (after the homonymous factions of the French Revolution). Aristeidis’ father, Konstantinos Kanaris, as well as his brother, Miltiadis, were prominent members of the Mountain. Lieutenant Aristedis Kanaris was ordered to go to the Palace in Athens as leader of a mixed force of the 1st, 2nd and 8th battalions of Infantry and a firemen force in order to strengthen the small Gendarmerie Force of the Palace that was loyal to the Government. On June 19, the conflict intensified when anti-government forces (loyal to Dimitrios Voulgaris) of artillery, infantry, gendarmerie and rural bandits who had sided with the opposition, moved to the Palace under the leadership of Lieutenant Colonel Dimitrios Papadiamantopoulos. This attack, although fierce, was repelled by the defenders under the command of Kanaris, who was killed by a bullet to his temple.

A temporary truce allowed Miltiadis Kanaris to transfer Aristeidis’ body to the house of their father in Plaka. During the funeral that was held the next day, riots were triggered when certain men of the "Plain" started to shoot.

== See also ==
- Evelpidon Military Academy
- Kanaris family
- History of Greece
