= Miltiadis Kanaris =

Greek admiral and politician

- Μιλτιάδης Κανάρης
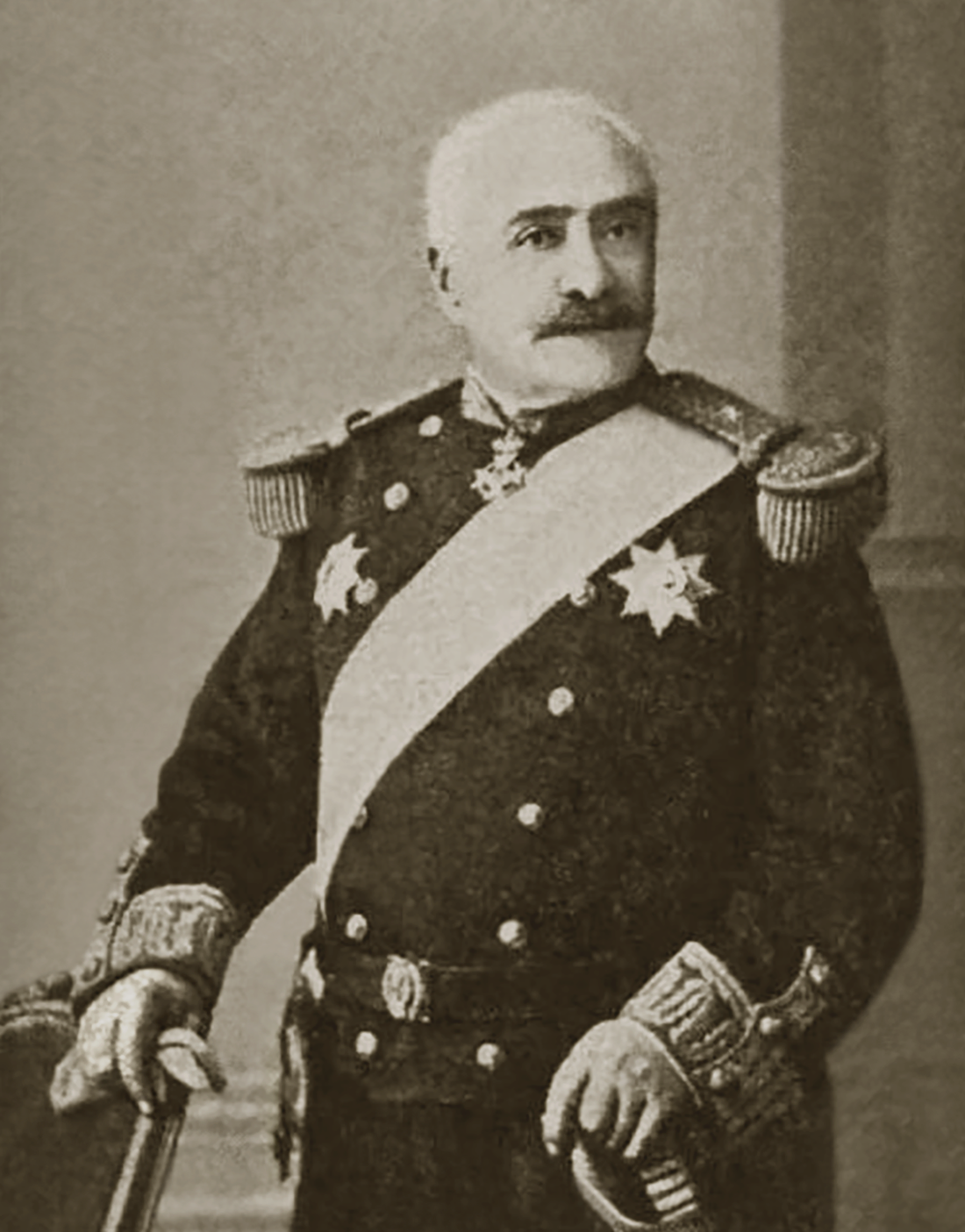
- Admiral Miltiadis Kanaris

Inspector General of the Navy
- In office 1886–1889

Minister of the Navy
- In office 1864–1878

Personal details
- Born: 6 June 1822 Psara, Ottoman Greece
- Died: 7 November 1901 (aged 79) Athens, Kingdom of Greece
- Children: Alexandros Kanaris; Leonidas Kanaris
- Parent: Konstantinos Kanaris (father)
- Profession: Admiral and politician
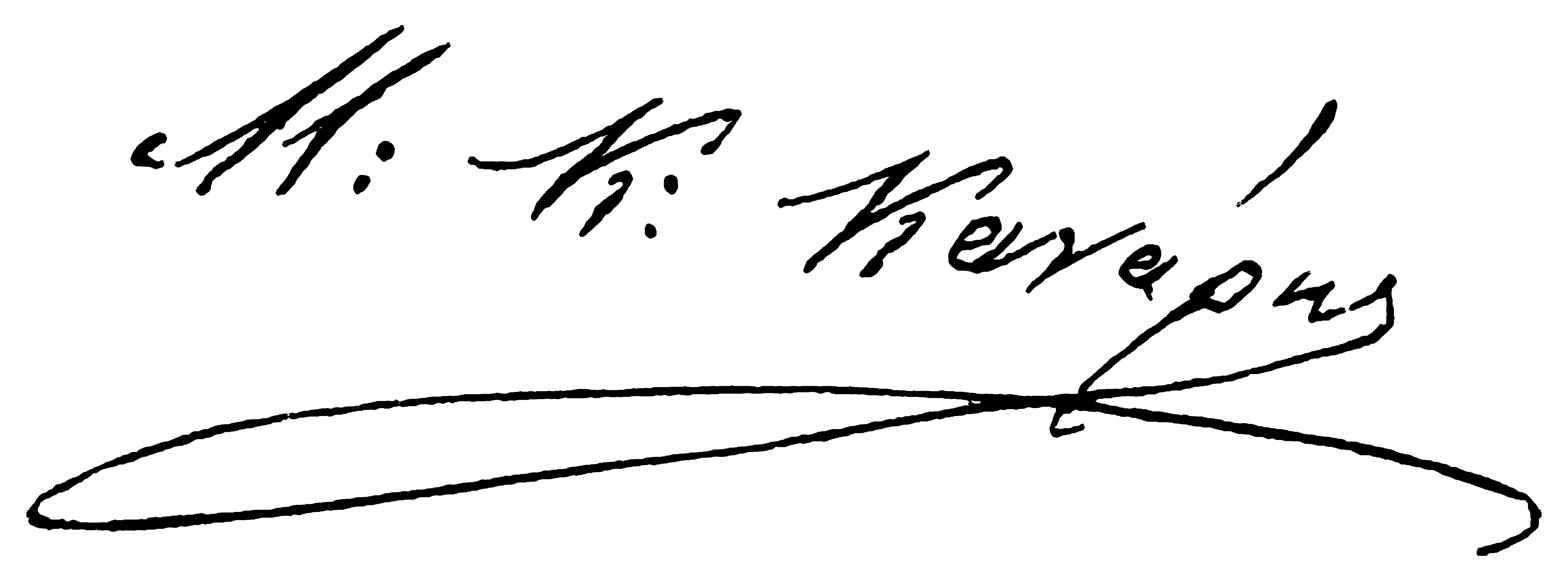
- Signature

Miltiadis Kanaris (Greek: Μιλτιάδης Κανάρης, 6 June 1822 – 7 November 1901) was a Greek admiral and politician. He was the son of Konstantinos Kanaris.

== Biography ==
He was born on 6 June 1822 in Psara as the fourth out of the seven children of Konstantinos Kanaris, a distinguished fighter of the Greek War of Independence and his wife Despoina Maniati. It was said that he was born on the same day that his father blew up the Turkish flagship at Chios. He studied in the Bavarian Military School in Munich from 1833 until 1843. After the end of his studies Kanaris joined the Greek Navy and later he continued his studies in France, where he served for three years in the French Navy. In 1886, he was Inspector General of the Greek fleet and three years later (1889) he retired, but was recalled to duty in 1897 when the Greco-Turkish War broke out, temporarily undertaking the leadership of the Battleship Squadron from 7 August until 20 December 1897.

At the same time he was involved in politics. He was elected a Member of Parliament for Syros and later Member of Parliament for Nea Psara. He became Minister for Naval Affairs three times, for three days in the Benizelos Roufos government (just before the outbreak of the Iouniana of 1864, where his brother Aristeidis was killed), in 1868–1869 and in 1879. In 1895 and after the disastrous 1897 war, King George I proposed him as Prime Minister, but Kanaris did not accept, as he demanded as a precondition for his appointment the convocation of a Revisionary Parliament to review the Greek Constitution of 1864.

He died in Athens on 7 November 1901. A day before his death, he was awarded the Grand Cross of the Order of the Redeemer. He was married and had two children, Alexandros Kanaris, who also became a politician, and Leonidas Kanaris.

== Decorations ==
Order of the Redeemer: Grand Cross (1901)

== See also ==
- Kanaris family
- Hellenic Navy
- History of Greece

== Bibliography ==
- Εγκυκλοπαίδεια Πάπυρος - Λαρούς - Μπριτάνικα, 1988, vol. 31.
- Νεώτερον Εγκυκλοπαιδικόν Λεξικόν Ηλίου, vol. 10.
- Σύγχρονος Εγκυκλοπαίδεια Ελευθερουδάκη, 1928, vol. 13.
- Ημερολόγιον Σκόκου, 1902, vol. 17.
