= Cross for the War of Independence 1821–29 =

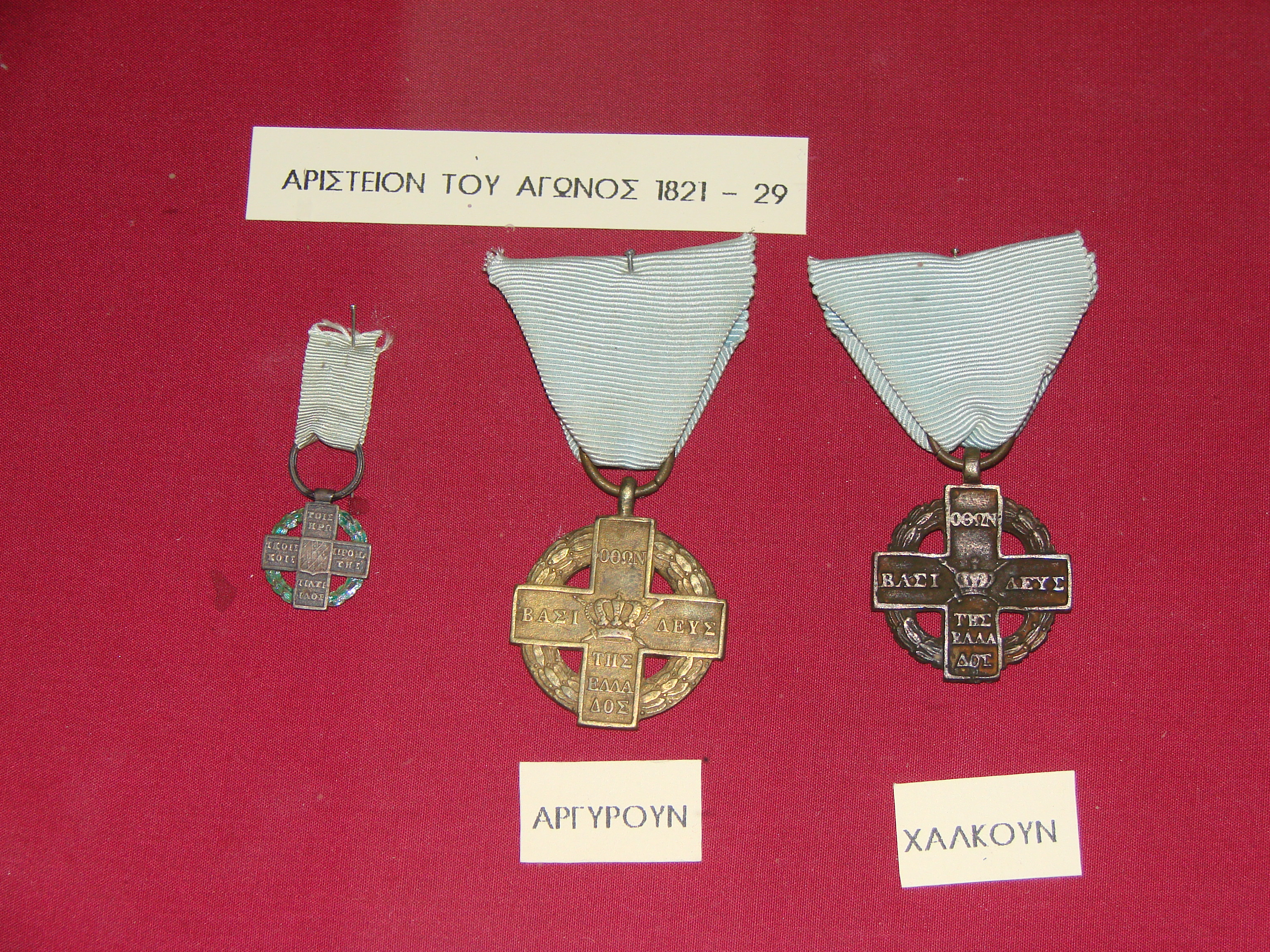
- Reverse of the cross, and its obverse in silver and bronze (left, center and right respectively)
- Type: Military decoration
- Country: Kingdom of Greece
- Eligibility: Military and civilian service in support of the military
- Campaign: Greek War of Independence
- Established: 20 May 1834
- Ribbon bar

The Cross for the War of Independence 1821–29 (Greek: Αριστείον του Αγώνος Ανεξαρτησίας 1821-1829) was a military decoration of Greece for participation in the Greek War of Independence.

== Regulations ==
The Cross for the War of Independence 1821–29 was established by royal decree on 20 May 1834, its regulations were further modified by the royal decrees of 18 September 1835 and 25 July 1838. It was confirmed by the 8th Act of the Hellenic National Assembly on 3 September 1843.

It was awarded to those who fought in the Greek War of Independence both members of the Greek military and civilians. It was awarded in three degrees, silver for officers, bronze for non-commissioned officers and iron for soldiers, sailors and civilians. The recipients of the cross received a number of privileges including bearing arms without a permit, being exempt from physical labor while carrying out general services for the state. They also received primacy during elections and occupied the first place of honor after members of the authorities.

== Appearance ==
The cross was designed by Bavarian engraver Konrad Lange. It has the form of a simple cross, the edges of which are surrounded by a laurel wreath, which in some forms of silver degree is covered with green enamel. In the center of the obverse there is a composition of an angular crown and two crossed swords and the inscription "Otto King of Greece". The reverse side of the cross bears the Bavarian coat of arms and the inscription "To the Heroic Defenders of the Fatherland". Both inscriptions were written in Greek. It was it was held by a pale blue 36 millimetres (1.4 in) wide ribbon and worn on the left side of the chest.

== Sources ==
- Beldecos, Georgios (1991). Τάγματα Αριστείας και Στρατιωτικά Μετάλλια της Ελλάδος [Hellenic Orders, Decorations and Medals] (in Greek). Athens War Museum. ISBN 960-85054-0-2.
- Dimacopoulos, George (1961). Greek Orders and Medals. Vol. I. A. Mavridis.
