= Konstantinos Kanaris =

Greek politician (c. 1790 – 1877)

- Κωνσταντίνος Κανάρης
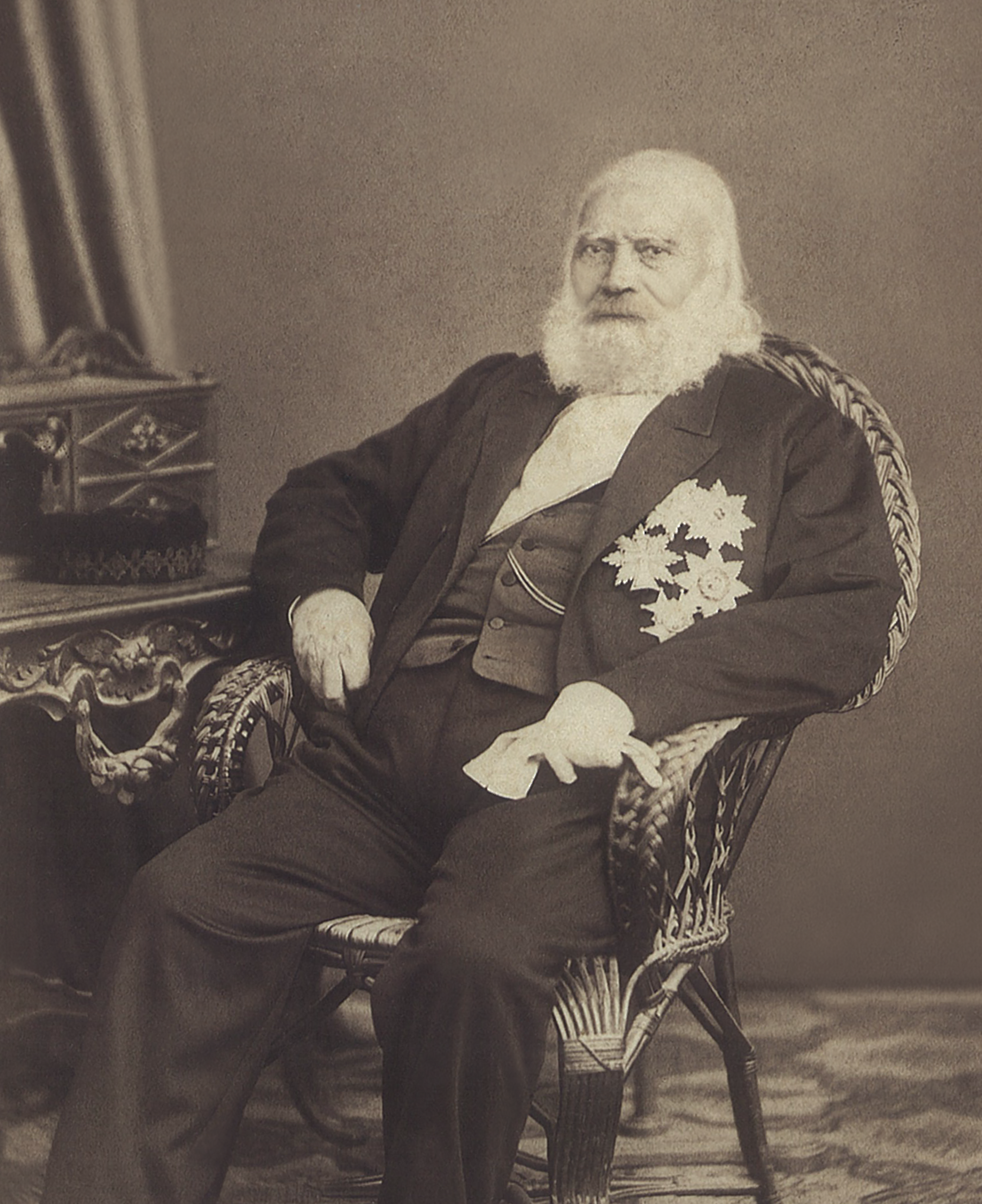
- Konstantinos Kanaris, Prime Minister of Greece.

Prime Minister of Greece
- In office 26 May 1877 – 2 September 1877
- Monarch: George I
- Preceded by: Alexandros Koumoundouros
- Succeeded by: Alexandros Koumoundouros (Note: Office remained vacant until 11 January 1878. During the vacancy, junior ministers exercised the duties of prime minister on a rotational basis.)
- In office 26 July 1864 – 2 March 1865
- Monarch: George I
- Preceded by: Zinovios Valvis
- Succeeded by: Alexandros Koumoundouros
- In office 5 March 1864 – 16 April 1864
- Monarch: George I
- Preceded by: Dimitrios Voulgaris
- Succeeded by: Zinovios Valvis
- In office 27 October 1848 – 14 December 1849
- Monarch: Otto
- Preceded by: Georgios Kountouriotis
- Succeeded by: Antonios Kriezis
- In office 12 February 1844 – 30 March 1844
- Monarch: Otto
- Preceded by: Andreas Metaxas
- Succeeded by: Alexandros Mavrokordatos

Personal details
- Born: c. 1790 Psara, Eyalet of the Archipelago, Ottoman Empire (now Greece)
- Died: 2 September 1877 (aged 86–87) Athens, Kingdom of Greece
- Resting place: First Cemetery of Athens
- Party: Russian Party
- Spouse: Despina Maniati
- Children: Nikolaos Kanaris; Miltiadis Kanaris; Themistoklis Kanaris; Aristeidis Kanaris; Lykourgos Kanaris; Maria Kanari; Thrasyvoulos Kanaris
- Awards: Grand Cross of the Order of the Redeemer; Cross for the War of Independence 1821–29; Grand Cross of the Royal Guelphic Order; Grand Cross of the Order of the Dannebrog

Military service
- Allegiance: First Hellenic Republic; Kingdom of Greece
- Branch/service: Hellenic Navy
- Years of service: 1821–1844
- Rank: Admiral
- Battles/wars: Greek War of Independence; Burning of the Ottoman Flagship; Destruction of Psara; Battle of Samos; Raid on Alexandria

Konstantinos Kanaris (Greek: Κωνσταντίνος Κανάρης, Konstantínos Kanáris; c. 1790 – 2 September 1877), also anglicised as Constantine Kanaris or Canaris, was a Greek statesman, an admiral, and a hero of the Greek War of Independence (1821–1829).

Despite not having been a member of the revolutionary organization Filiki Eteria, his fleet engaged in several successful battles and operations against the Ottoman Navy from 1821 to 1824, most famously burning the Ottoman flagship off Chios in 1822, in retaliation for the Chios massacre; this action elevated him to the status of national hero. Despite the destruction of his home island Psara in 1824, and the ambitious, but failed Raid on Alexandria in 1825, he remained a prominent ally of Ioannis Kapodistrias (in office as Governor of Greece from 1828 to 1831) until the latter's assassination in 1831, which led to his retirement.

After the 3 September 1843 Revolution, Kanaris returned to public life as a prominent member of the powerful Russian Party and became the Kingdom of Greece's second prime minister in 1844, presiding over the fall of his party in government. During King Otto's constitutional reign (1843 to 1862), Kanaris returned as prime minister in 1848, and became minister of the navy in 1854, after the outbreak of the Crimean War in 1853. He played a prominent role in Otto's deposition in 1862, and under King George I became prime minister twice in 1864, resigning both times to retire in Athens. He returned to the premiership to lead a grand coalition government in 1877 before dying 99 days later of a heart attack, becoming the second prime minister to die in office. His most significant actions as head of government were the ratification of the country's first two constitutions, in 1844 and 1864.

He remains a celebrated figure among Greeks and is recognised as the maritime leader of the Greek revolutionaries during the War of Independence.

== Biography ==
=== Early life ===
Konstantinos Kanaris was born and grew up on the island of Psara, close to the island of Chios, in the Aegean. The exact year of his birth is unknown. Official records of the Hellenic Navy indicate 1795, however, modern Greek historians consider 1790 or 1793 to be more probable.

He was left an orphan at a young age. Having to support himself, he chose to become a seaman like most members of his family since the beginning of the 18th century. He was subsequently hired as a boy on the brig of his uncle Dimitris Bourekas.

=== Military career ===
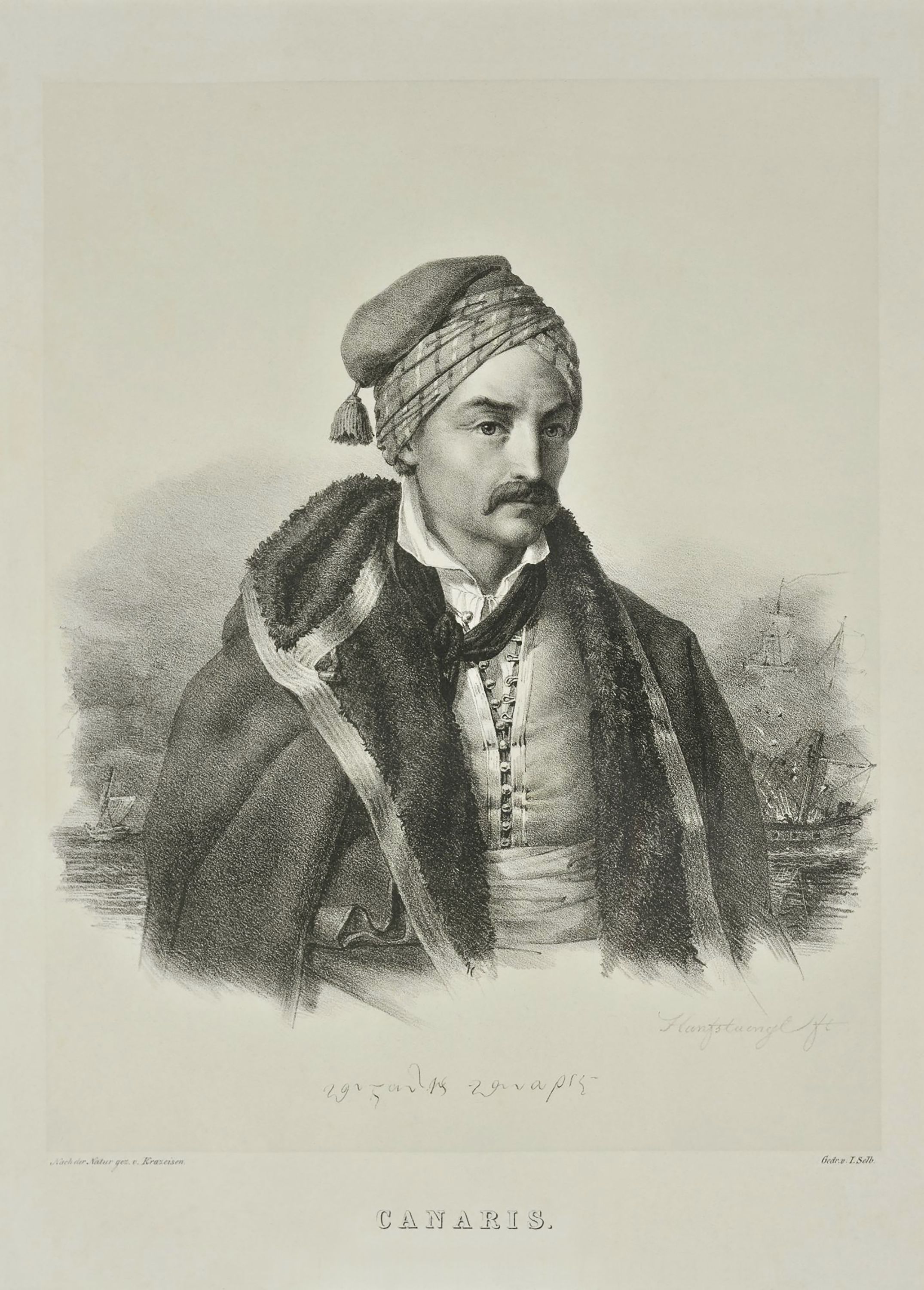
Konstantinos Kanaris during the Greek War of Independence. Lithography by Karl Krazeisen, 1831.

Kanaris gained his fame during the Greek War of Independence (1821–1829). Unlike most other prominent figures of the War, he had never been initiated into the Filiki Eteria (Society of Friends), which played a significant role in the uprising against the Ottoman Empire, primarily by secret recruitment of supporters against the Turkish rule.

By early 1821, the movement had gained enough support to launch a revolution. This seems to have inspired Kanaris, who was in Odessa at the time. He returned to the island of Psara in haste and was present when it joined the uprising on 10 April 1821.

The island formed its own fleet and the famed seamen of Psara, already known for their well-equipped ships and successful battles against sea pirates, proved to be highly effective in naval warfare. Kanaris soon distinguished himself as a fire ship captain.

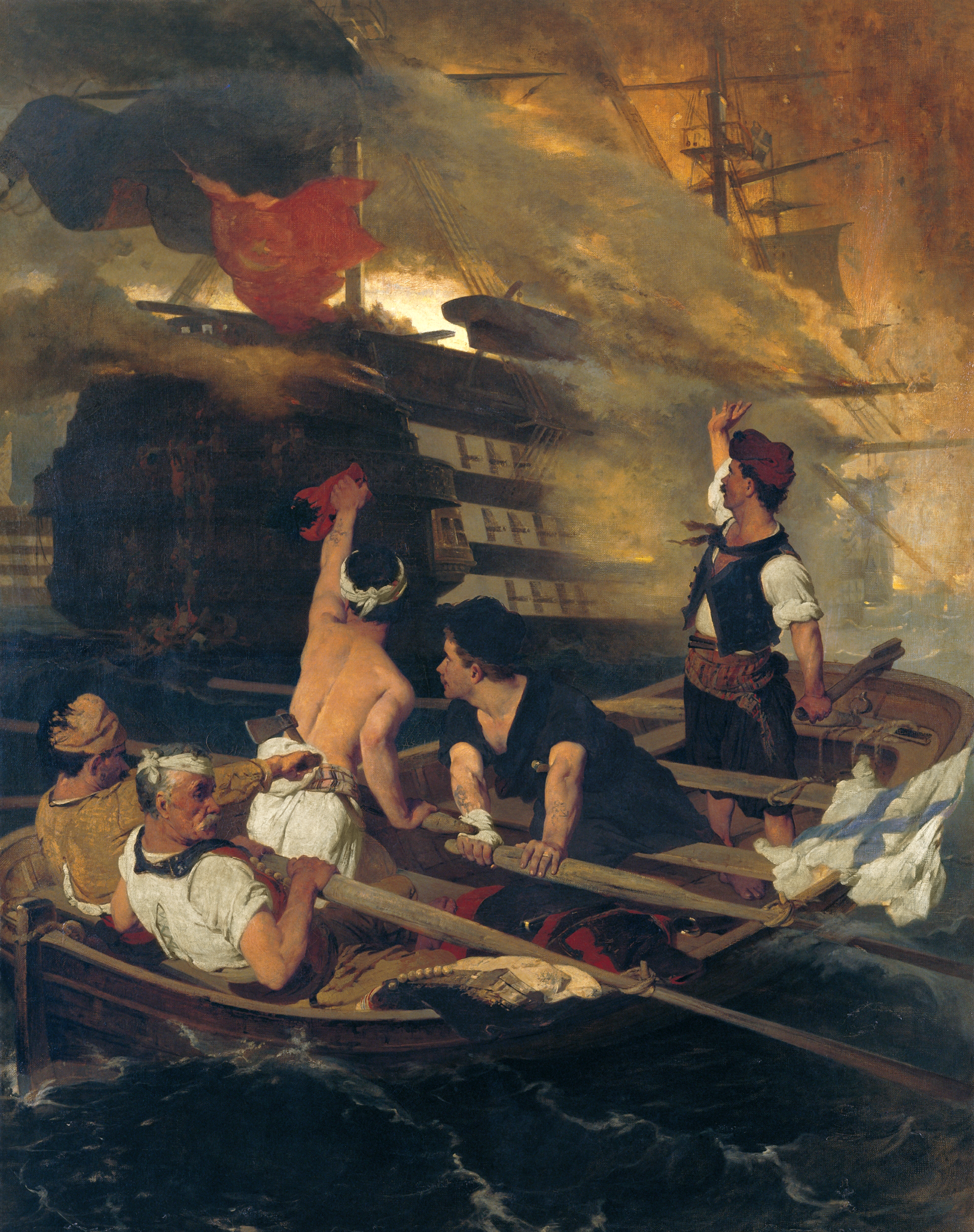
The burning of the Turkish flagship by Kanaris. Painting by Nikiforos Lytras, 1873.

At Chios, on the moonless night of 6–7 June 1822, forces under his command destroyed the flagship of Nasuhzade Ali Pasha, Kapudan Pasha (Grand Admiral) of the Ottoman fleet, in revenge for the Chios massacre. The admiral was holding a Bayram celebration, allowing Kanaris and his men to position their fire ship without being noticed. When the flagship's powder store caught fire, all men aboard were instantly killed. The Turkish casualties comprised 2,300 men, both naval officers and common sailors, as well as Nasuhzade Ali Pasha himself.

Kanaris led another successful attack against the Ottoman fleet at Tenedos in November 1822. He was famously said to have encouraged himself by murmuring "Konstantí, you are going to die" every time he was approaching a Turkish warship on the fire boat he was about to detonate.

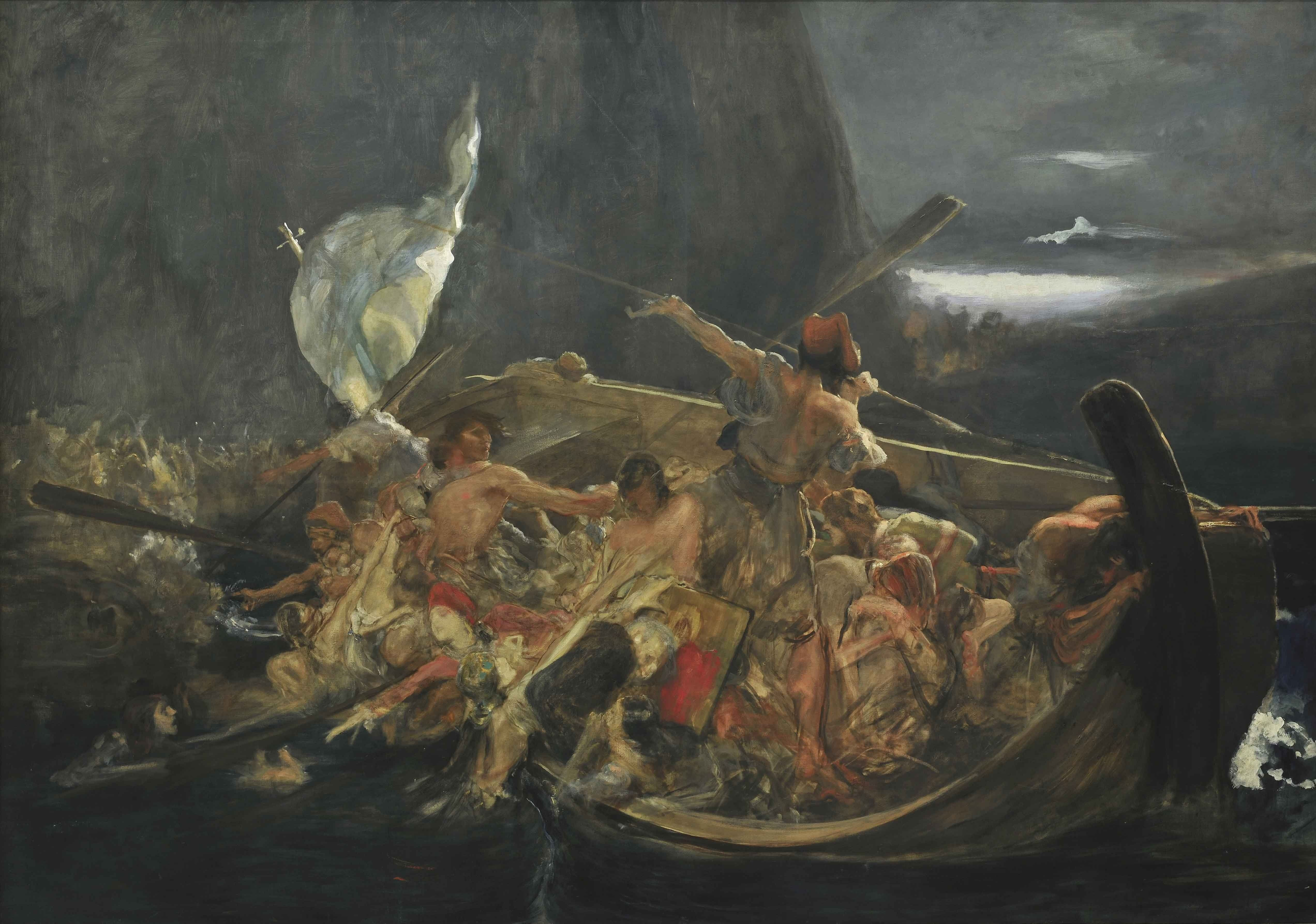
After the destruction of Psara. Painting by Nikolaos Gyzis, 1898.

The Ottoman fleet captured Psara on 21 June 1824. A part of the population, including Kanaris, managed to flee the island, but those who didn't were either sold into slavery or slaughtered. After the destruction of his home island, he continued to lead attacks against Turkish forces. In August 1824, he engaged in naval combats in the Dodecanese.

The following year, Kanaris led the Greek raid on Alexandria, a daring attempt to destroy the Egyptian fleet with fire ships that might have been successful if the wind had not failed just after the Greek ships entered Alexandria harbour.

After the end of the War and the independence of Greece, Kanaris became an officer of the new Hellenic Navy, reaching the rank of admiral, and a prominent politician.

=== Political career ===
Konstantinos Kanaris was one of the few with the personal confidence of Ioannis Kapodistrias, the first Head of State of independent Greece. After the assassination of Kapodistrias on 9 October 1831, he retired to the island of Syros.

During the reign of King Otto I, Kanaris served as Minister in various governments and then as Prime Minister in the provisional government (16 February – 30 March 1844). He served a second term (15 October 1848 – 12 December 1849), and as Navy Minister in the 1854 cabinet of Alexandros Mavrokordatos.

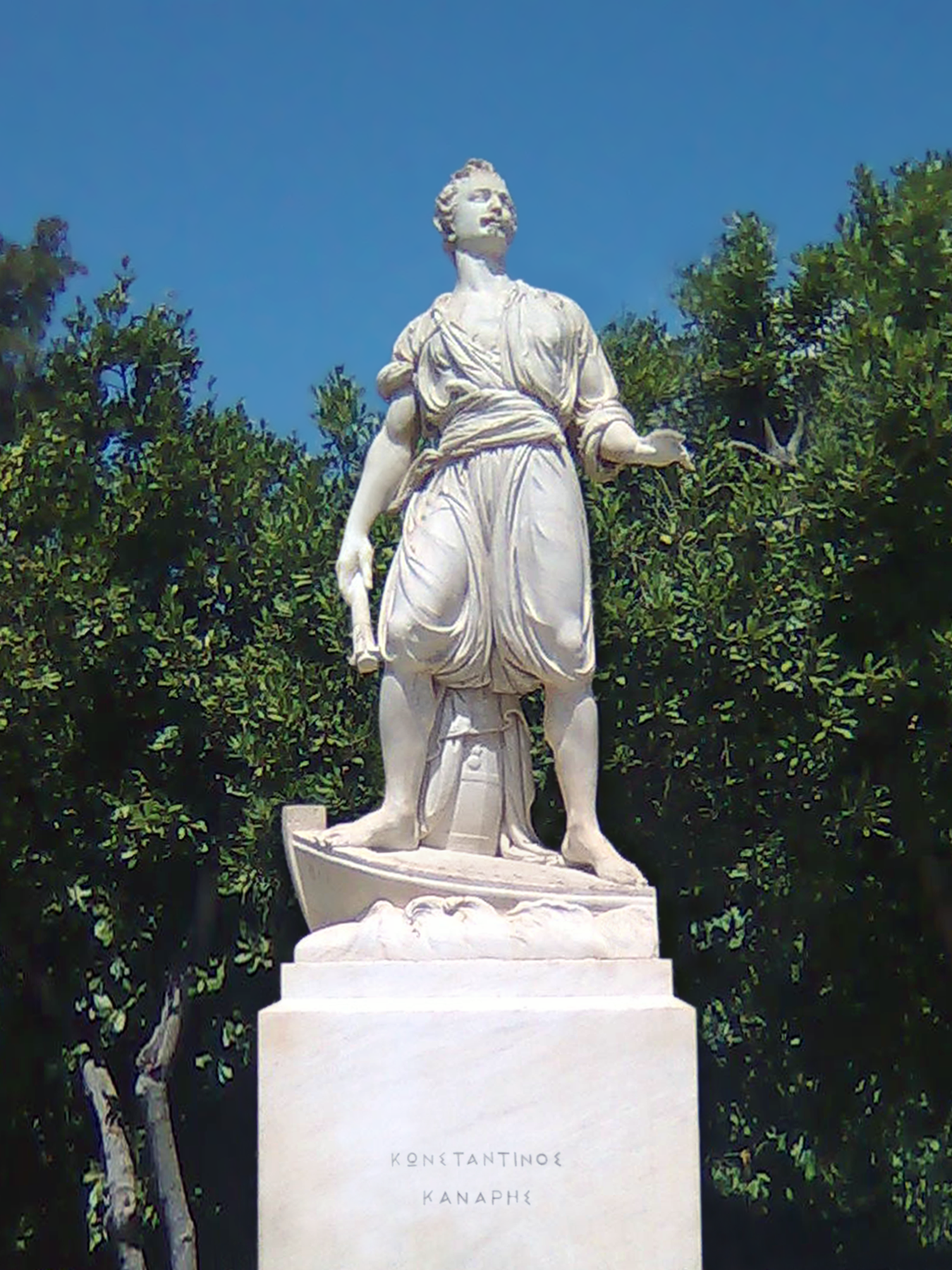
Monument to Konstantinos Kanaris in Kypseli, Athens. Sculpture by Lazaros Fytalis.

In 1862, he was among the rare War of Independence veterans who took part in the bloodless insurrection that deposed the increasingly unpopular King Otto I and led to the election of Prince William of Denmark as King George I of Greece. During his reign, Kanaris served as a Prime Minister for a third term (6 March – 16 April 1864), fourth term (26 July 1864 – 26 February 1865), and fifth and last term (7 June – 2 September 1877).

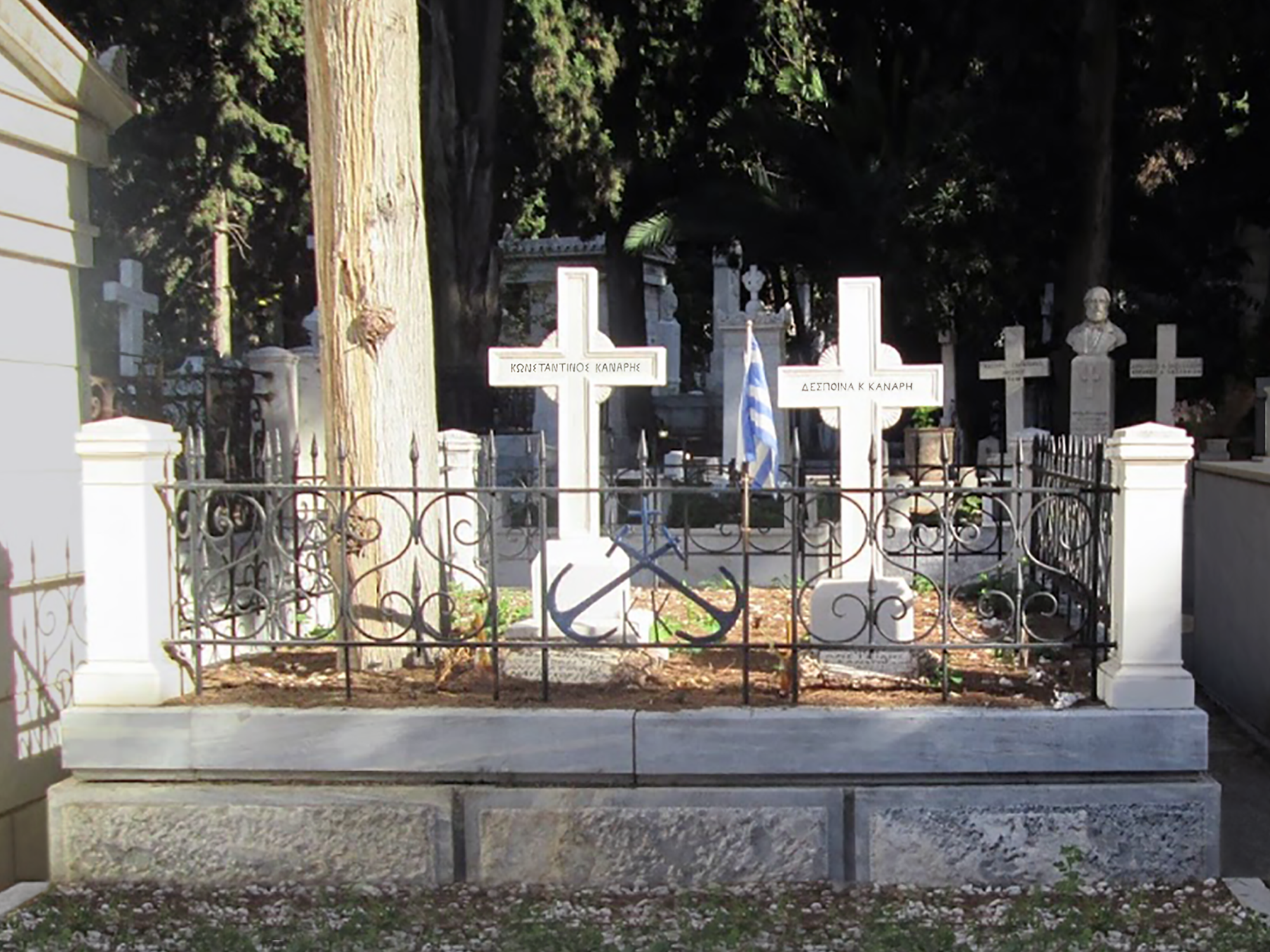
Grave of Konstantinos and Despoina Kanaris in the First Cemetery of Athens.

Kanaris died on 2 September 1877 whilst still serving in office as prime minister. Following his death his government remained in power until 14 September 1877 without agreeing on a replacement at its head. He was buried in the First Cemetery of Athens and his heart was placed in a silver urn.

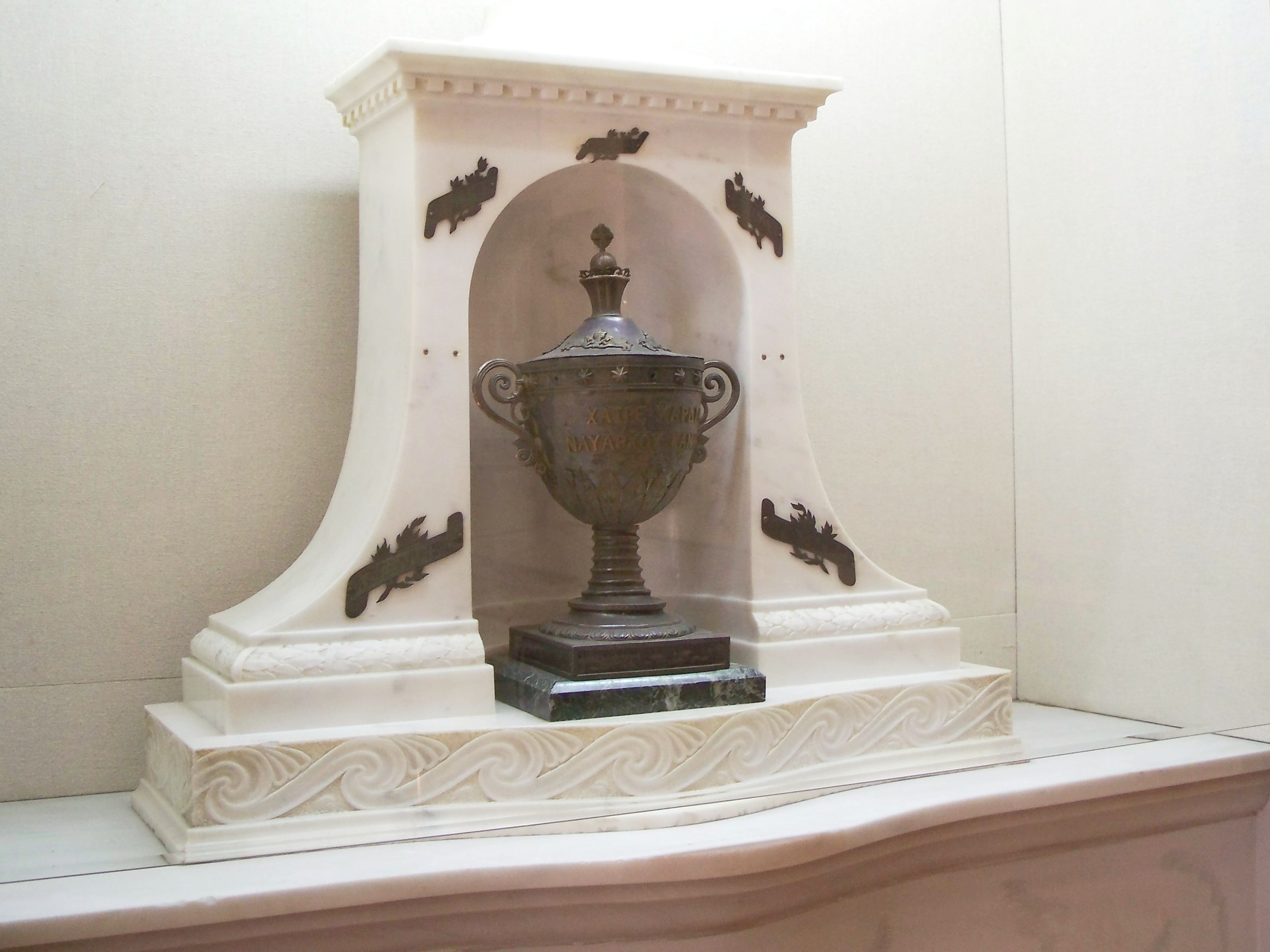
Silver urn containing the heart of Konstantinos Kanaris at the National Historical Museum, Athens.

== Legacy ==
Konstantinos Kanaris is considered a national hero in Greece and ranks amongst the most notable participants of the War of Independence. Many statues and busts have been erected in his honour, such as Kanaris at Chios by Benedetto Civiletti in Palermo, a statue by Lazaros Fytalis in Athens, and a bust by David d'Angers. He was also featured on a Greek ₯1 coin and a ₯100 banknote issued by the Bank of Greece.

To honour Kanaris, the following ships of the Hellenic Navy have been named after him:

- Kanaris, a gunboat commissioned in 1835
- Kanaris, a torpedo boat tender commissioned in 1880
- Kanaris (L53), a Hunt-class destroyer commissioned in 1942
- Kanaris (D212), a Gearing-class destroyer commissioned in 1972
- Kanaris (F464), an Elli-class frigate commissioned in 2002

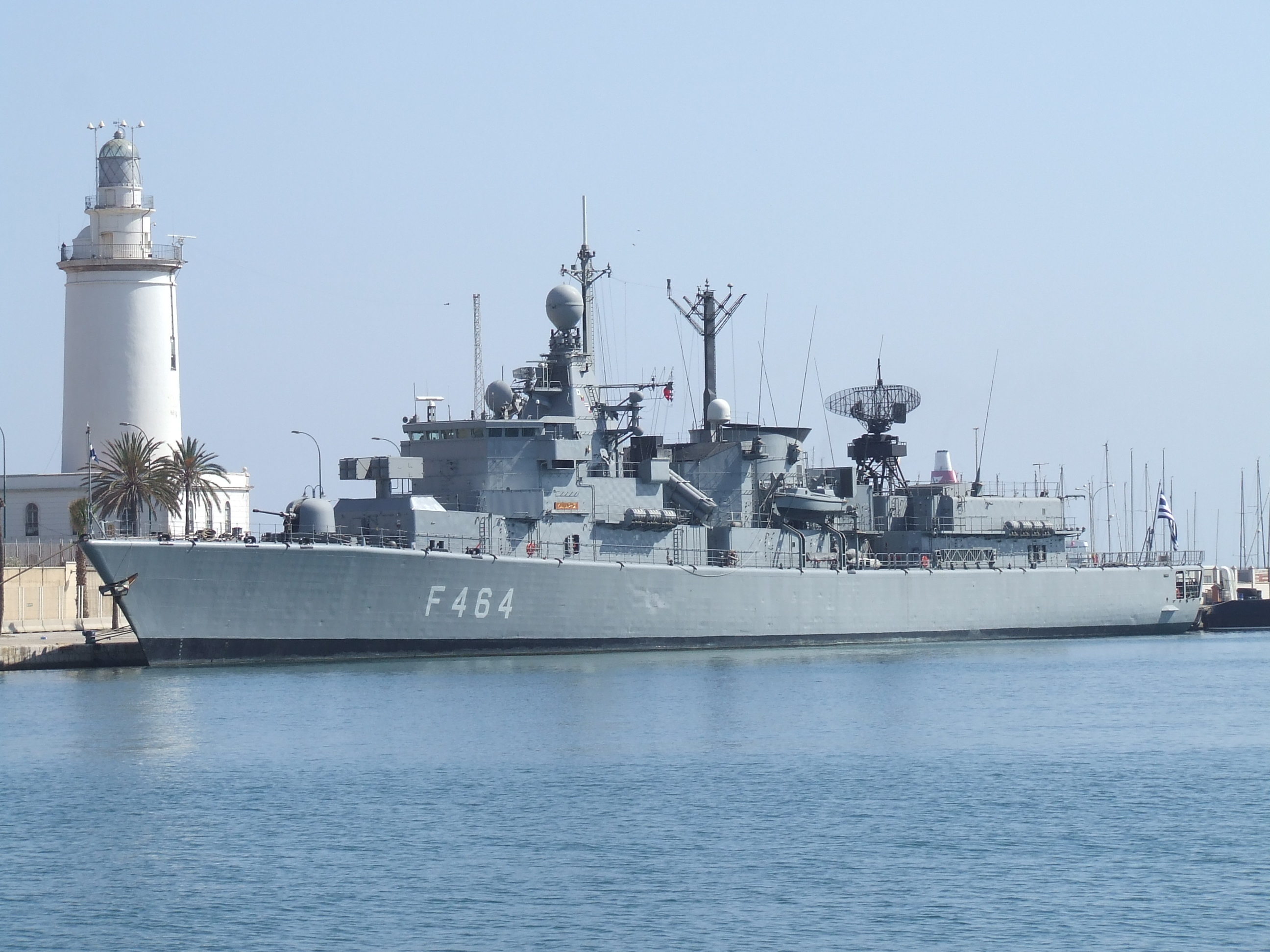
Elli-class frigate Kanaris (F464) of the Hellenic Navy.

Te Korowhakaunu / Kanáris Sound, a section of Taiari / Chalky Inlet in New Zealand's Fiordland National Park, was named after Konstantinos Kanaris by French navigator and explorer Jules de Blosseville (1802–1833).

== Family ==
In 1817, Konstantinos Kanaris married Despoina Maniatis, from a historical family of Psara.

They had seven children:

- Nikolaos Kanaris (1818–1848), killed during a military expedition in Beirut
- Themistoklis Kanaris (1819–1851), killed during a military expedition in Egypt
- Thrasyvoulos Kanaris (1820–1898), admiral
- Miltiadis Kanaris (1822–1901), admiral, member of the Greek Parliament for many years, Naval Minister three times in 1864, 1871, and 1878
- Lykourgos Kanaris (1826–1865), naval officer and lawyer
- Maria Kanaris (1828–1847), married A. Balabano
- Aristeidis Kanaris (1831–1863), officer killed in the uprising of 1863

Wilhelm Canaris, a German Admiral, speculated that he might be a descendant of Konstantinos Kanaris. An official genealogical family history that was researched in 1938 showed however, that he was of Italian descent and not related to the Kanaris family from Greece.

== Honours ==
=== Greek honours ===
- Order of the Redeemer (Kingdom of Greece): Grand Cross, 1864
- Cross for the War of Independence 1821–29 (Kingdom of Greece): 1834

=== Foreign honours ===
- Royal Guelphic Order (Kingdom of Hanover): Grand Cross
- Order of the Dannebrog (Kingdom of Denmark): Grand Cross

== See also ==
- List of prime ministers of Greece
- Greek War of Independence
- Kanaris family
- Hellenic Navy
- History of Greece
- Greek ship Kanaris
- First Cemetery of Athens

Political offices
Preceded by Andreas Metaxas	Prime Minister of Greece; 12 February - 30 March 1844	Succeeded by Alexandros; Mavrokordatos
Preceded by Georgios; Kountouriotis	Prime Minister of Greece; 27 October 1848 - 14 December 1849	Succeeded by Antonios Kriezis
Preceded by Dimitrios; Voulgaris	Prime Minister of Greece; 5 March - 16 April 1864	Succeeded by Zinovios Valvis
Preceded by Zinovios Valvis	Prime Minister of Greece; 26 July 1864 - 2 March 1865	Succeeded by Alexandros; Koumoundouros
Preceded by Alexandros; Koumoundouros	Prime Minister of Greece; 26 May 1877 - 11 January 1878	Succeeded by Alexandros; Koumoundouros
