= Kanaris at Chios =

Sculpture by Benedetto Civiletti

- Kanaris a Scio
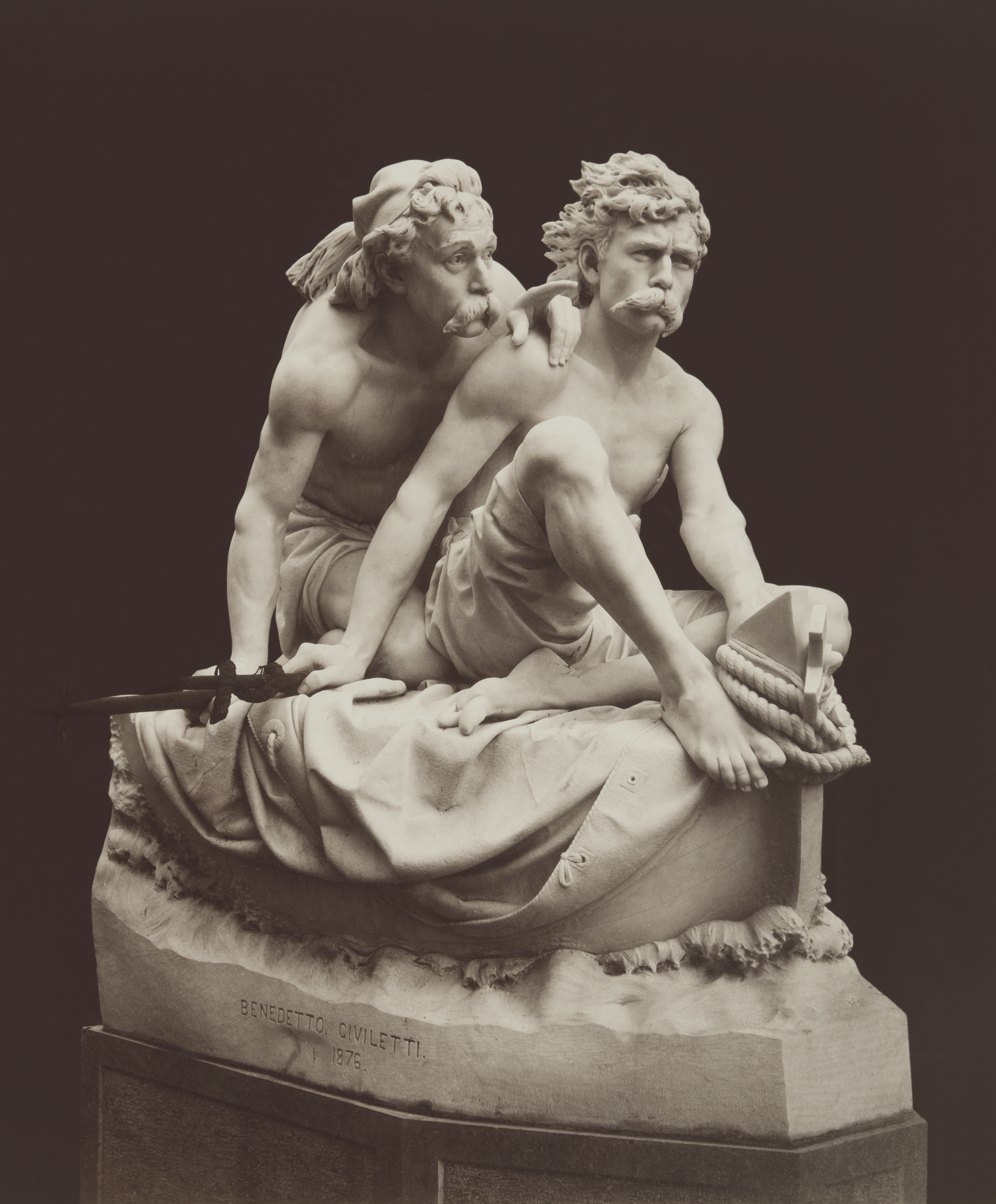
- Photography by Giorgio Sommer, 1888.
- Interactive map of Kanaris at Chios
- Location: Giardino Inglese, Palermo
- Coordinates: 38°07′56″N 13°21′07″E
- Designer: Benedetto Civiletti
- Material: Marble
- Dedicated date: 1878
- Dedicated to: Konstantinos Kanaris and Andreas Pipinos

Kanaris at Chios (Italian: Kanaris a Scio), also known as The Kanaris brothers (I fratelli Kanaris) or The sailors of the English Garden (I marinai del Giardino Inglese), is a marble sculpture completed by Benedetto Civiletti in Palermo, Sicily in 1878. It represents Konstantinos Kanaris (in front) and Andreas Pipinos at Chios, as they were sailing on board a fireboat towards the Ottoman flagship of admiral Nasuhzade Ali Pasha. This event, known as the burning of the Ottoman flagship off Chios took place on the night of 18 June 1822 during the Greek War of Independence, and was a reprisal for the Chios massacre which occurred two months earlier. Two thousand Ottoman sailors were killed, including Nasuhzade Ali Pasha himself.

== History and description ==
The Greek War of Independence stirred Romantic artists in Post-Napoleonic Europe, including Eugène Delacroix in his painting The Massacre at Chios (1824), musician Gioachino Rossini in his opera Le siège de Corinthe (1826) and many writers, such as Victor Hugo, Percy Bysshe Shelley and Lord Byron (who died in Greece during the war). Civiletti was apparently inspired by the recently published Scene Elleniche antica e nuova Grecia, written by Angelo Brofferio, which included a description of the burning of the Ottoman flagship off Chios. For Civiletti, the topic may have resonated with the nationalistic fervor in Italy after its unification; in retrospect however, the individualistic firebrands could also be viewed as anarchist patriots.

The work was first made in a stucco and exhibited in Palermo in 1875, where it was purchased by Prince Umberto di Savoia, who requisitioned a marble copy which he donated to the Comune of Palermo. In 1878, the sculpture was awarded a gold medal at the Exposition Universelle of Paris. Initially placed in the gardens of Villa Giulia in Palermo, it was later moved to its current location, where it is displayed, albeit in a vandalized state, in a small Neo-Moorish pavilion in the Giardino Inglese public park.

== Gallery ==
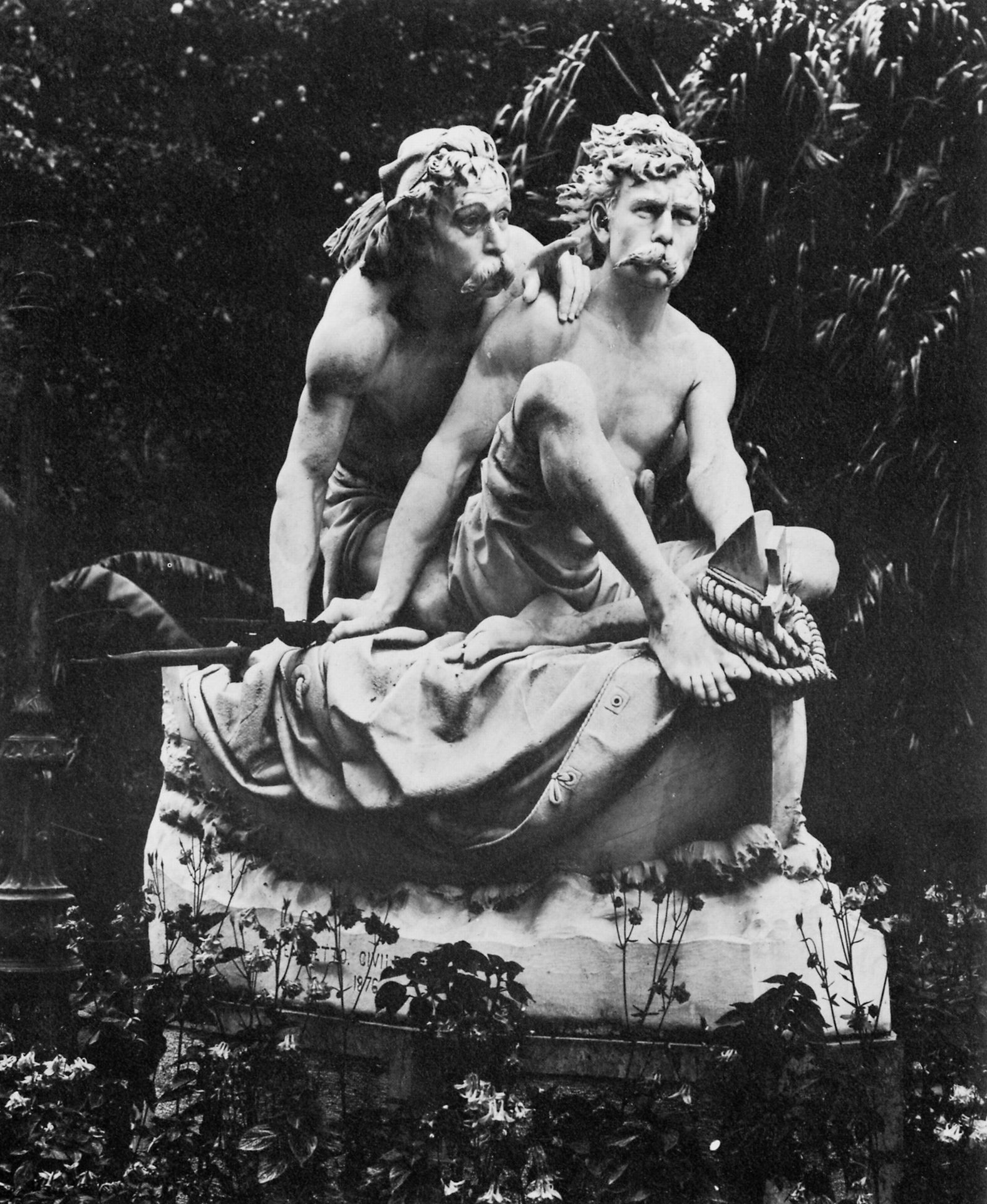
The sculpture in Villa Giulia, Palermo, 1898.

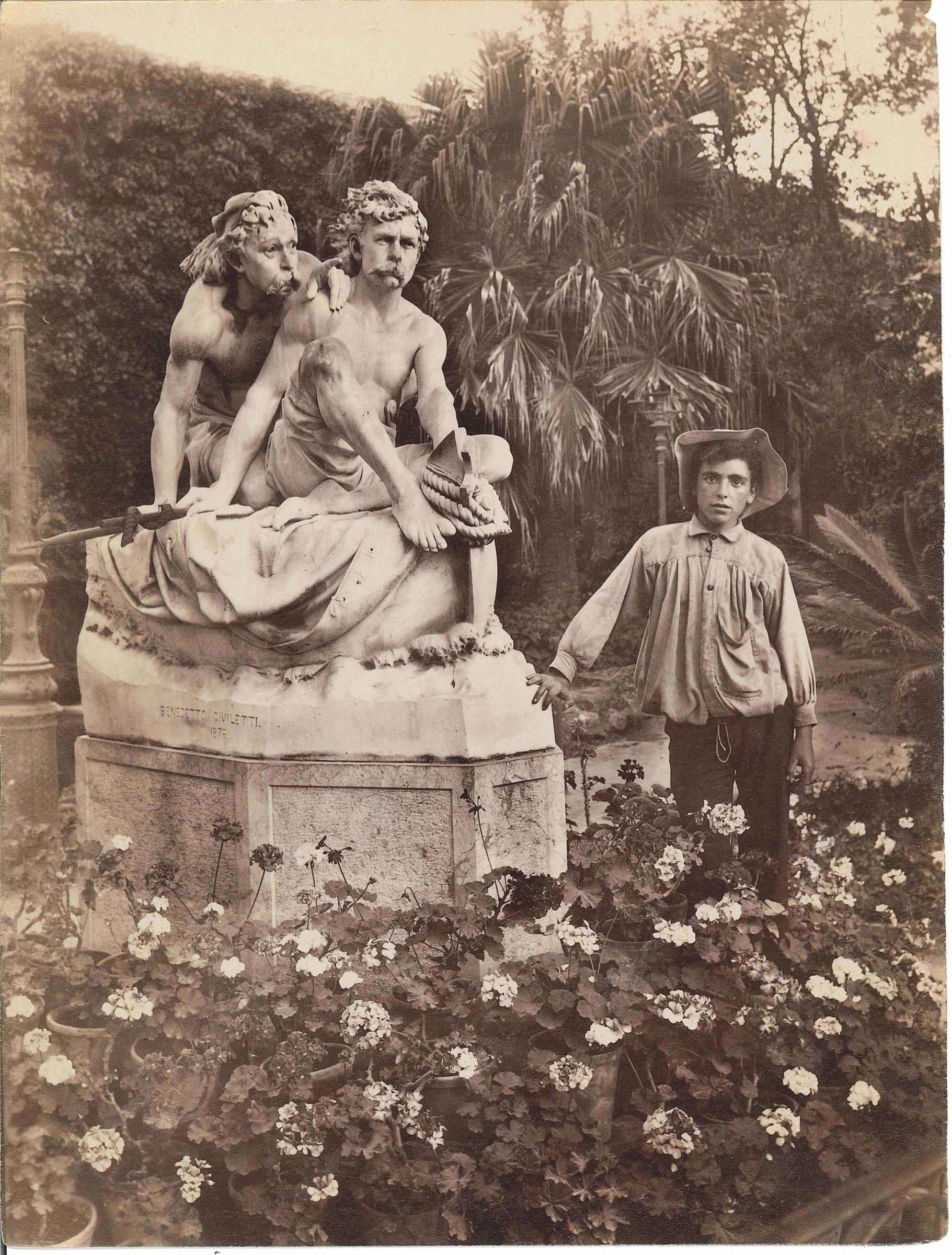
The sculpture in Villa Giulia, Palermo, 1900s.

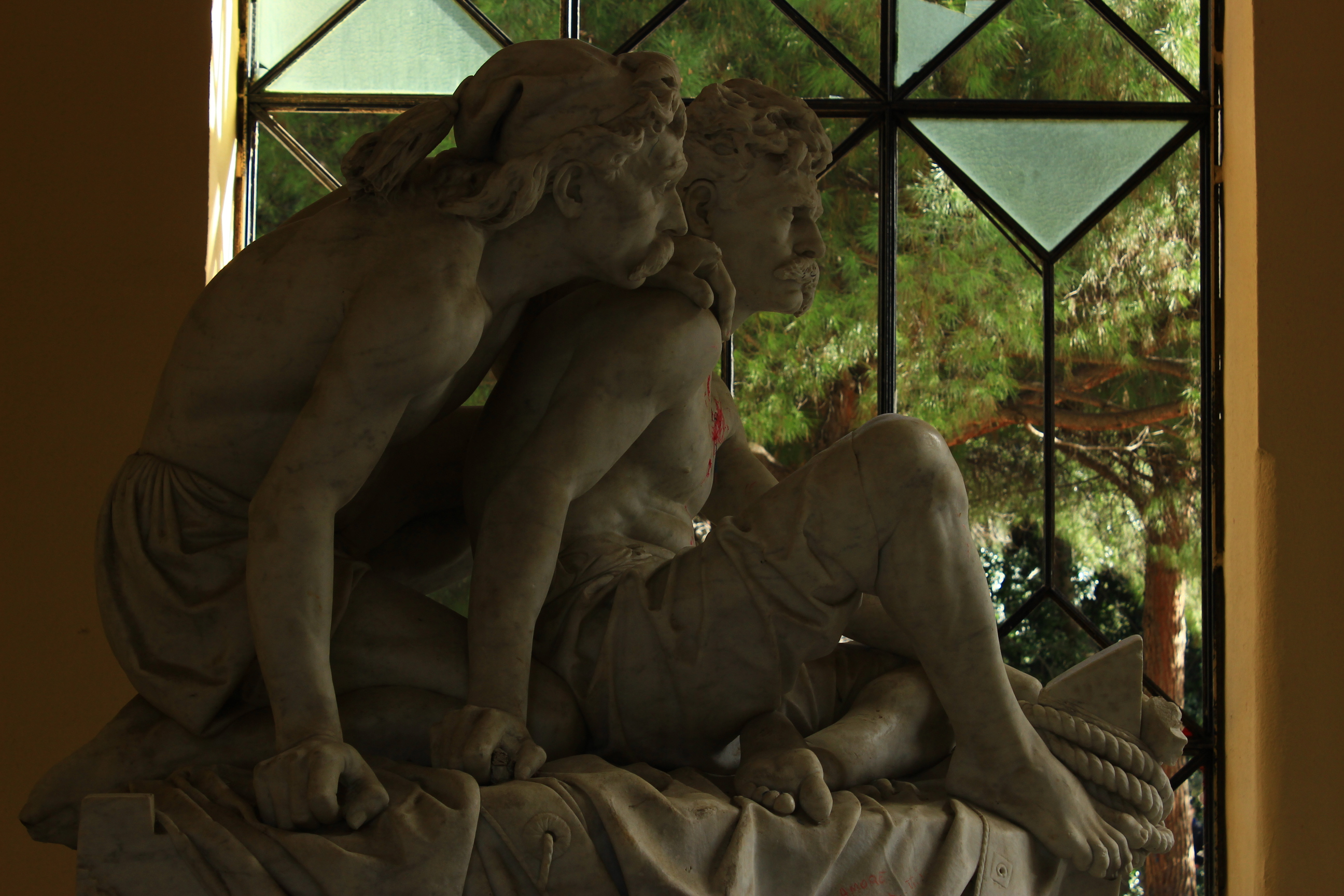
The sculpture in the Giardino Inglese, Palermo, 2014.

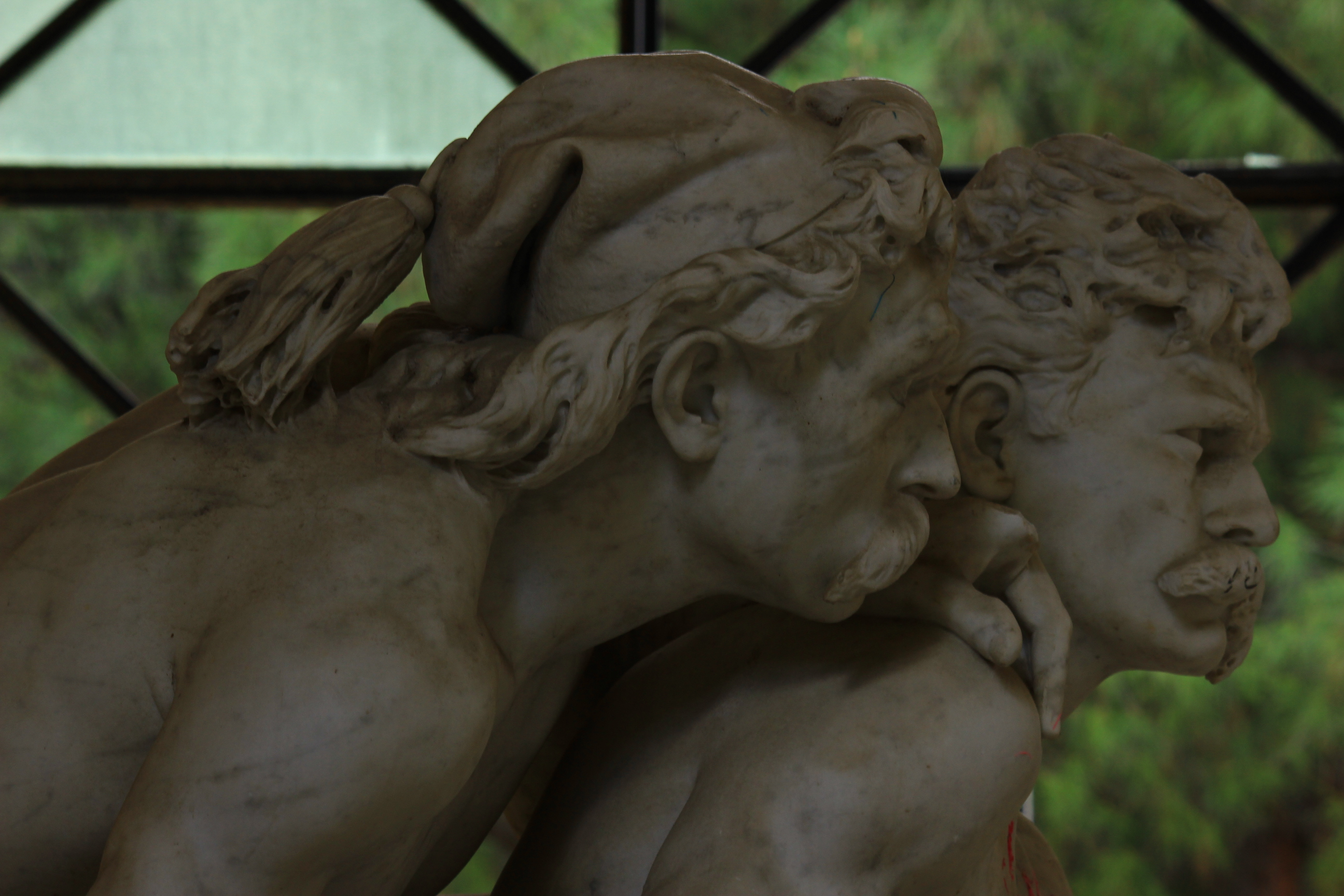
The sculpture in the Giardino Inglese, Palermo, 2014.

== See also ==
- Burning of the Ottoman flagship off Chios
- Giardino Inglese (Palermo)
- Konstantinos Kanaris
