= English Garden (disambiguation) =

English Garden may refer to:

- Gardens in England
- English landscape garden
- Englischer Garten, a park in Munich, Bavaria
- English Garden, a park in Palermo, Sicily
- English Garden (album), an album by Bruce Woolley and The Camera Club, or the title song
- "English Garden" (Ringo Starr song)
