= Piazza Castelnuovo =

Square in Palermo, Italy

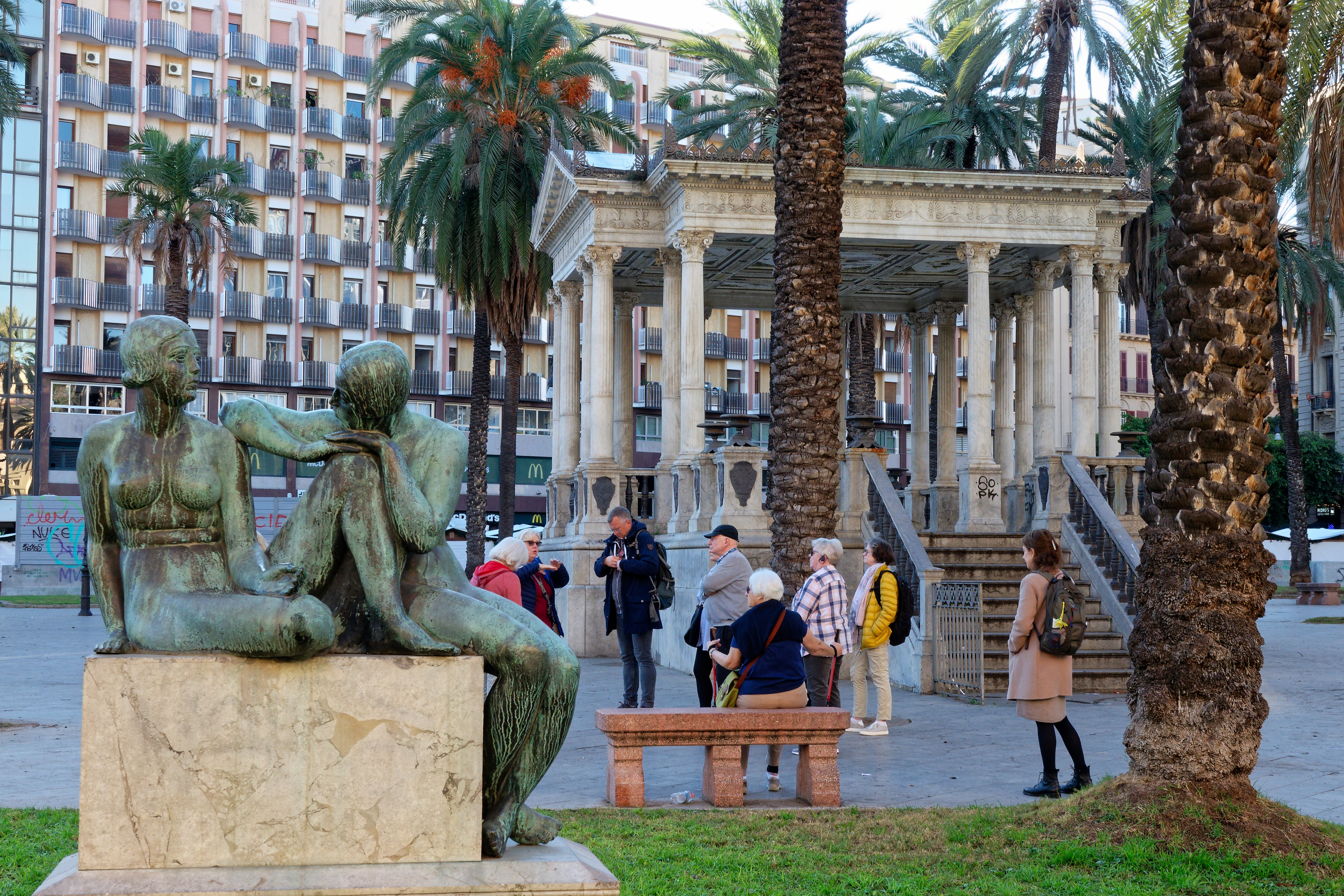
- The sculpture "Senzatetto" (Homeless People) and the "Palchetto della Musica" in the background
- Interactive map of Piazza Castelnuovo
- Location: Palermo, Sicily, Italy
- Coordinates: 38°07′30.5″N 13°21′24″E

Piazza Castelnuovo is a square of Palermo. Along with the contiguous Piazza Ruggero Settimo, it forms a single urban space, commonly called Piazza Politeama, by virtue of the presence of Teatro Politeama, the second most important theatre of the city after Teatro Massimo. The square is located between Via Ruggero Settimo, Viale della Libertà and Via Dante, near the historic centre of Palermo, and represents one of the most popular city's square.

On Piazza Castelnuovo are located a structure called "Palchetto della Musica" (work of Salvatore Valenti), the monument to Carlo Cottone (work of Giovan Battista Palazzotto and Domenico Costantino), the sculptures "Nautica" (work of Mario Rutelli), "Lavoro" (work of Benedetto Civiletti) and "Senzatetto" (work of Pasquale Civiletti).

The square is named after Carlo Cottone, prince of Castelnuovo, one of the advocate of the Sicilian Constitution of 1812.

== Gallery ==
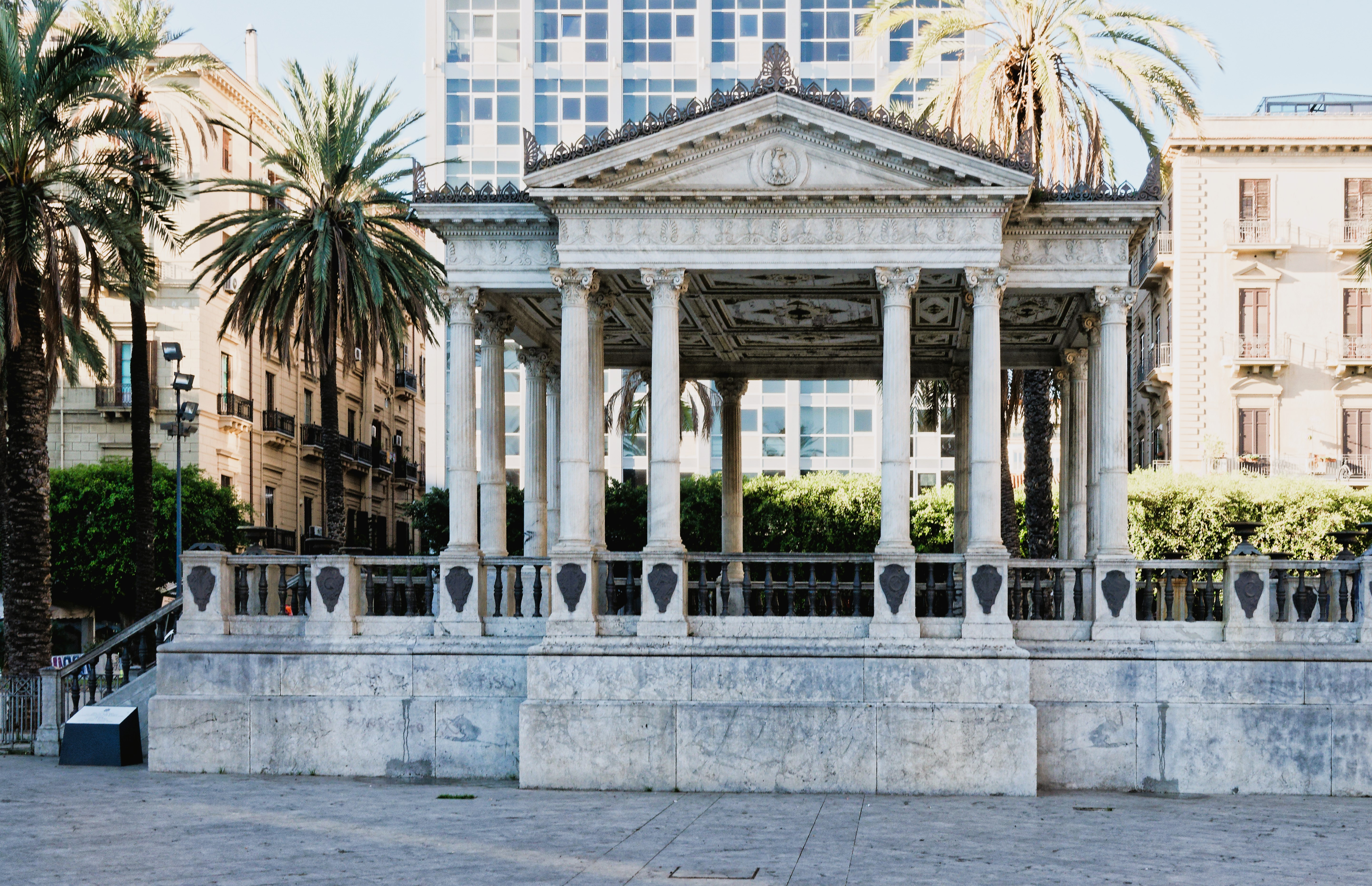
Palchetto della Musica

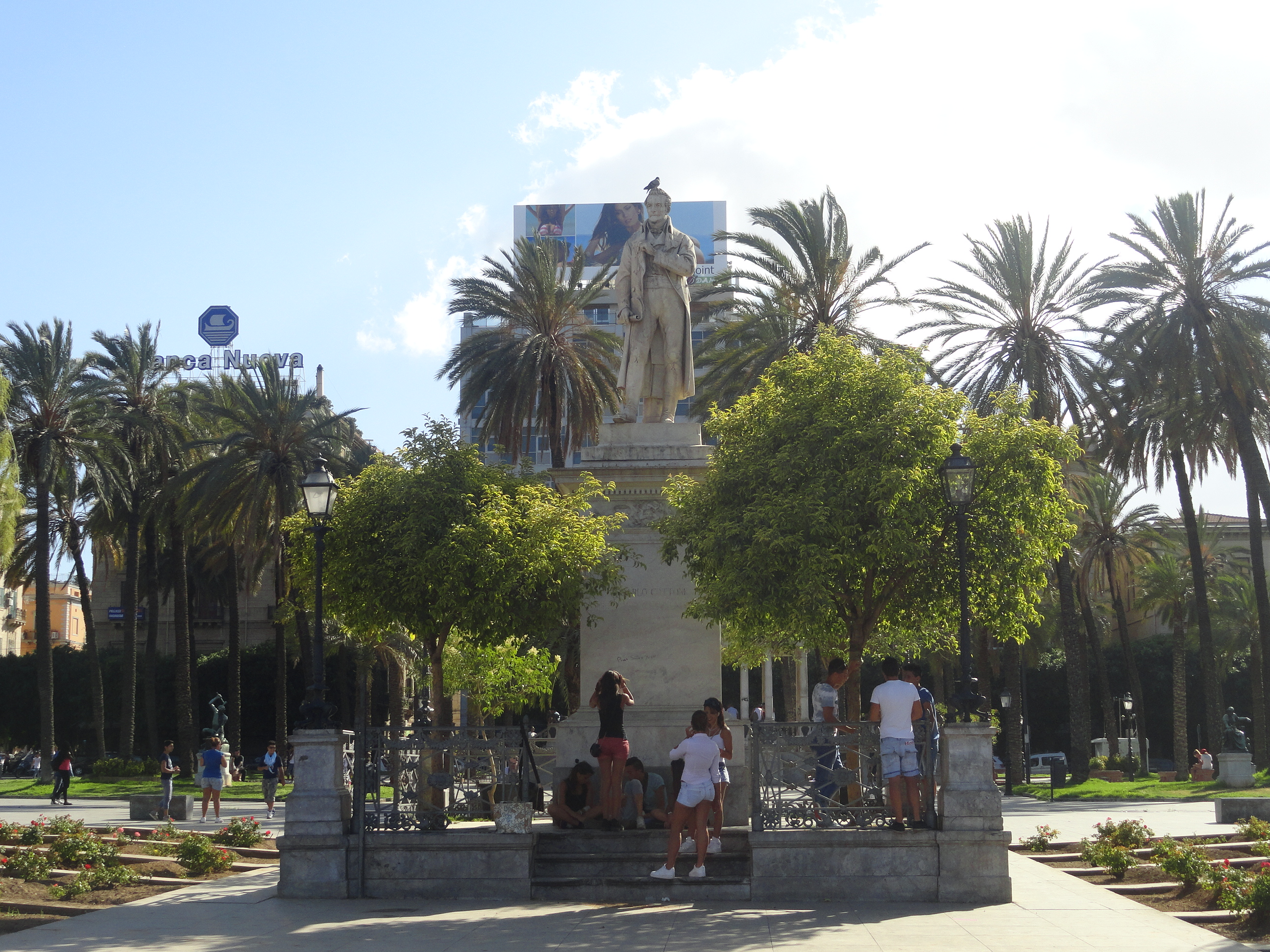
Monument to Carlo Cottone

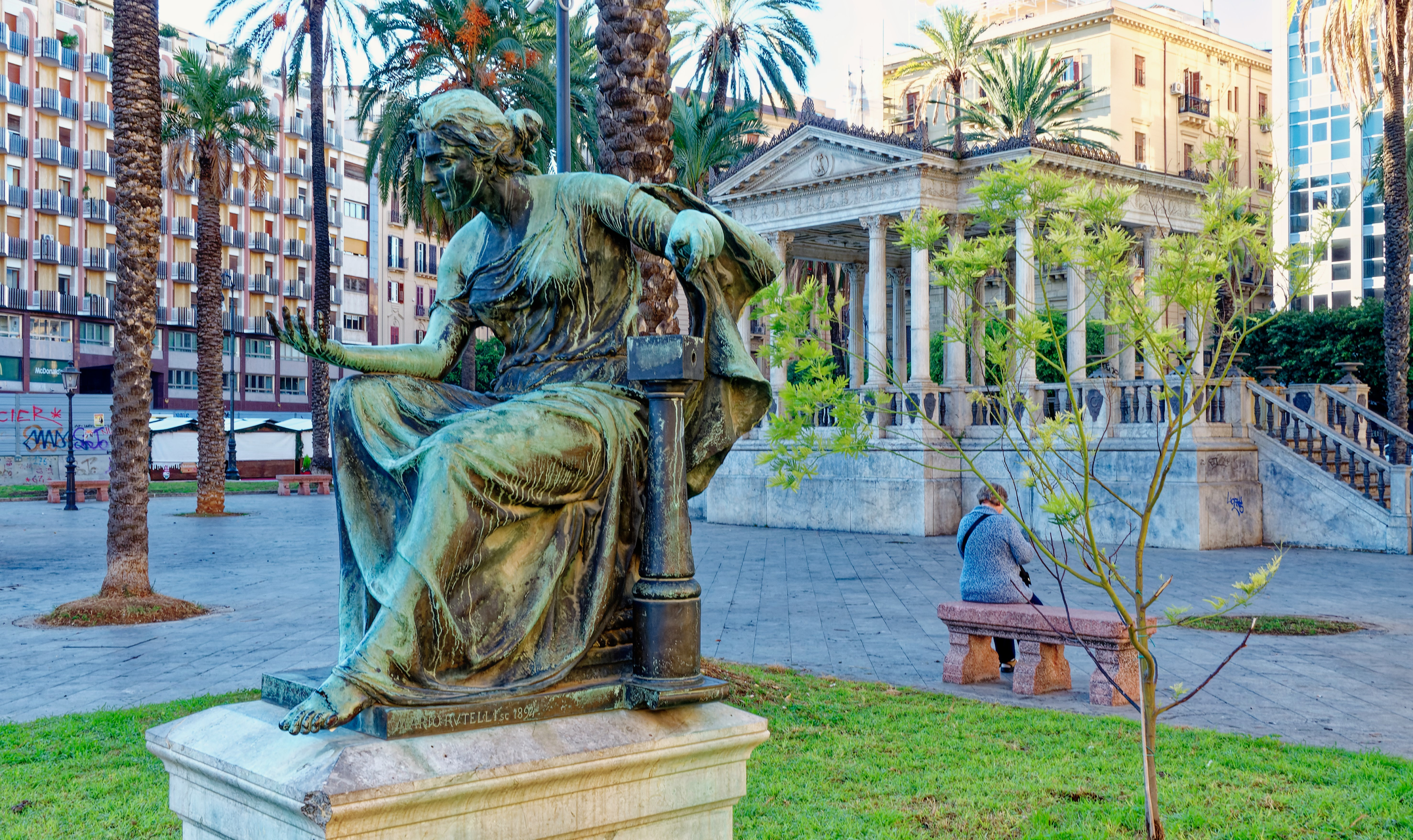
Nautica

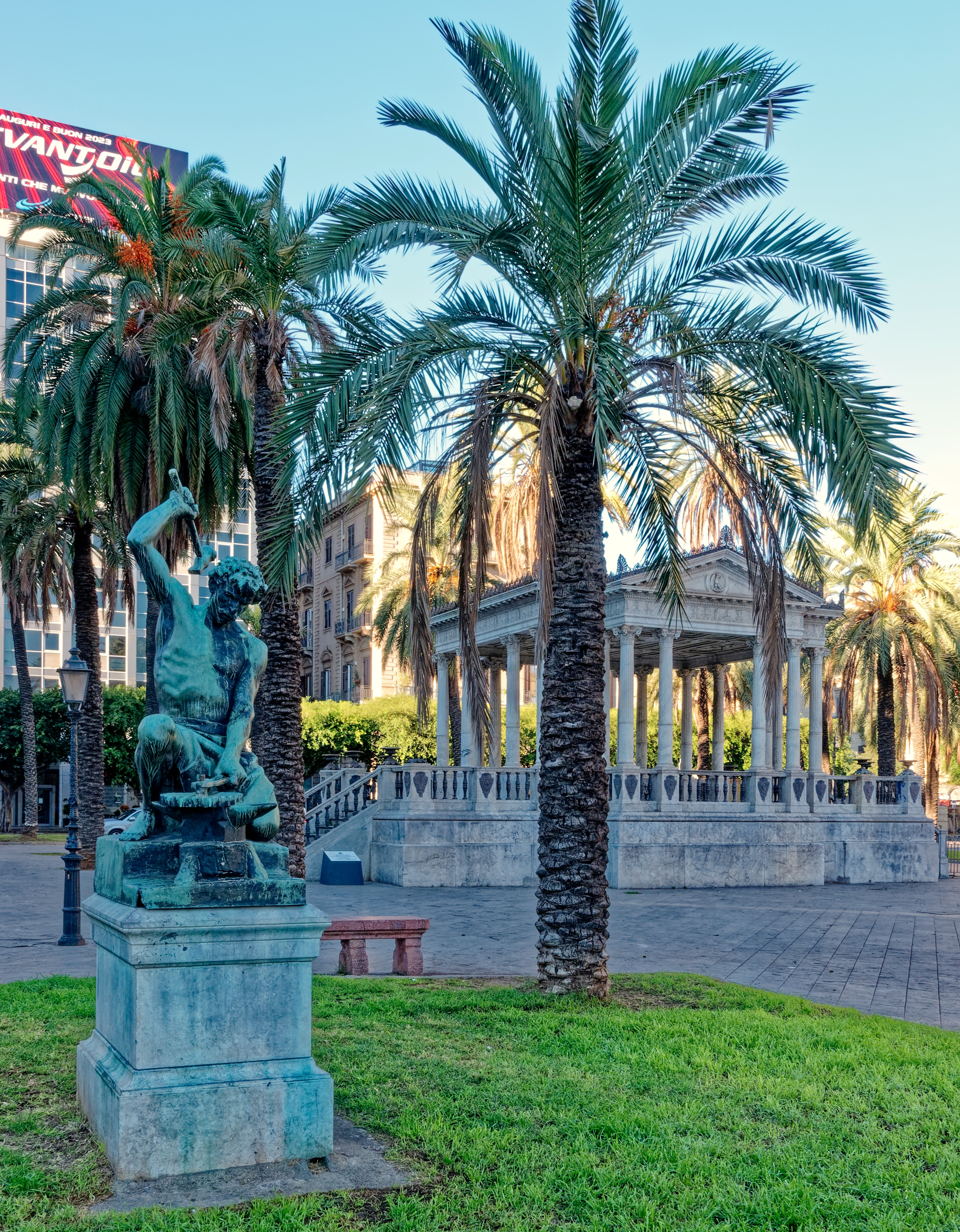
Lavoro

== See also ==
- Piazza Ruggero Settimo
- Teatro Politeama
