= Benedetto Civiletti =

Italian sculptor (1845–1899)

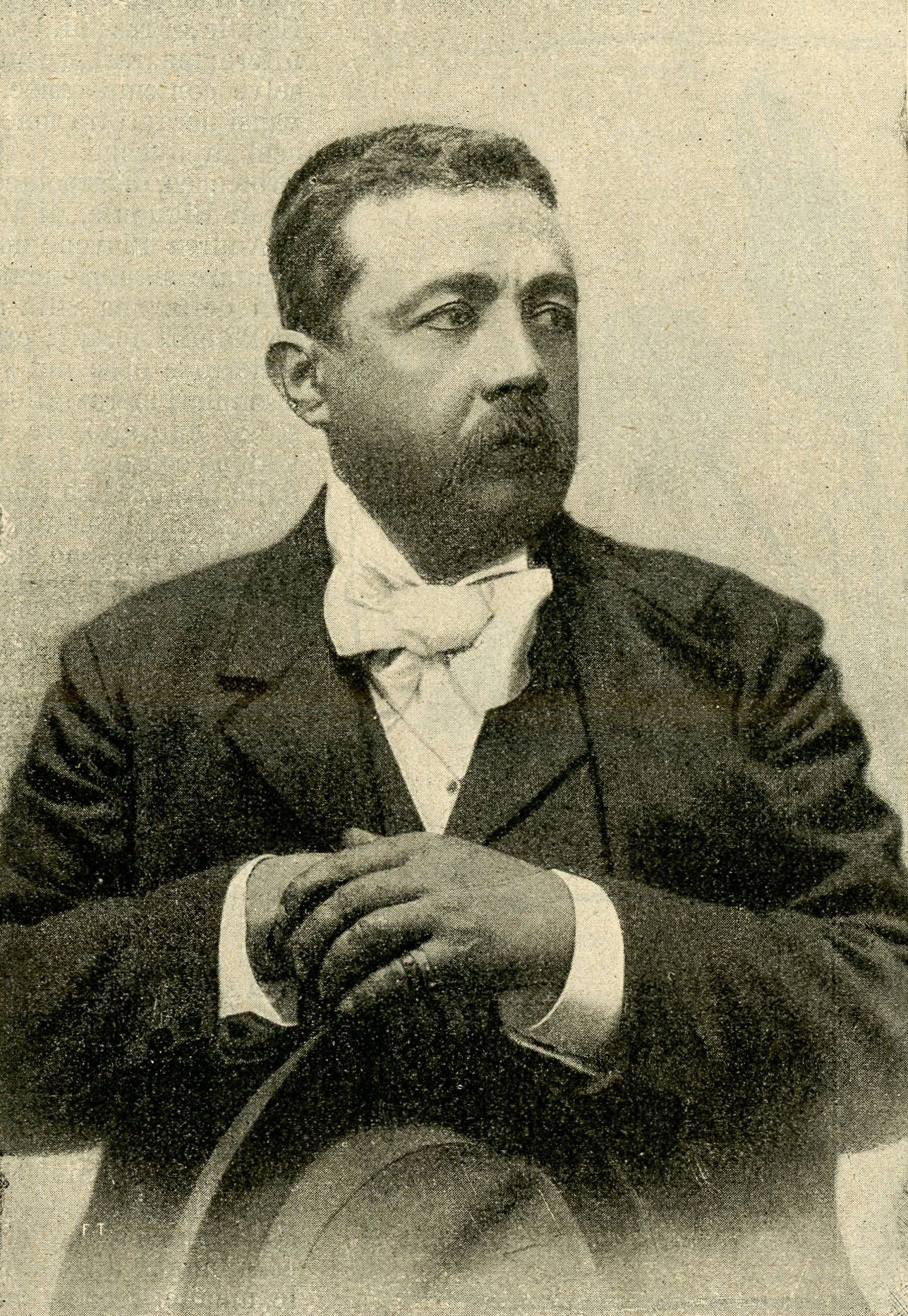
- Born: 1 October 1845; Palermo, Sicily, Italy
- Died: 22 September 1899 (aged 53); Palermo, Sicily, Italy
- Known for: Sculptor

Benedetto Civiletti (1 October 1845 – 22 September 1899) was an Italian sculptor, active mainly in his native Sicily. He is known for his Romantic-style public sculptures on allegorical, genre, or historical themes.

== Biography ==
Benedetto was born just outside of Palermo to poor parents, but apparently enjoyed making figurines in clay and stucco as a child. The nobleman Cavalier Guli noticing a work of the boy, obtained for him work in the studio of a ceramic presepe or nativity scene artisan. He came to the attention of the Praetor of Palermo, prince Galati, who recommended him to study design with the painter Andrea D'Antoni, who seeing the boy's affinity to sculpture, placed him in the care of the sculptor Benedetto Delisi. In 1863, a sculpture of a Faun gained him the admiration of local artistic community. He gained a pension to train under the sculptor Giovanni Dupré in Florence. He returned in 1865 to Palermo.

In Palermo, he completed the statue of a Young Dante or Dantino, exhibited in Milan, Vienna, and the Universal Exposition in New Orleans, it won a diploma of honor at the latter showing. He then completed Ricordo, exhibited in Palermo, and purchased for a mere 60 lire by Baron Tortirici. For some years, Benedetto labored at portraits and funeral monuments. Influenced by the stories of the Greek struggles for freedom in both the past and present, written by Angelo Brofferio in his Scene Elleniche antica e nuova Grecia, Civiletti created Kanaris a Scio, known in Palermo as Fratelli Kanaris or I marinai del Giardino Inglese. This large marble sculpture shows two mustachioed and earnest men, one of them the Greek freedom fighter Konstantinos Kanaris, guiding a fire ship with explosives towards the Ottoman fleet. Purchased by Prince Umberto di Savoia during its exhibition in Palermo, the sculpture was subsequently widely exhibited in Vienna, then Paris where it won a gold medal at the Exposition Universelle in 1878.

He was prolific over the next decade with statues of Jesus in Gesthemane, Julius Caesar, The Last Hour of Missolonghi, La Rosmunda, Frederick II set first stone of Castle of Palermo, and others exhibited in various European capitals.

He died in Palermo, Sicily. Many of his public works are on display there.

== Gallery ==
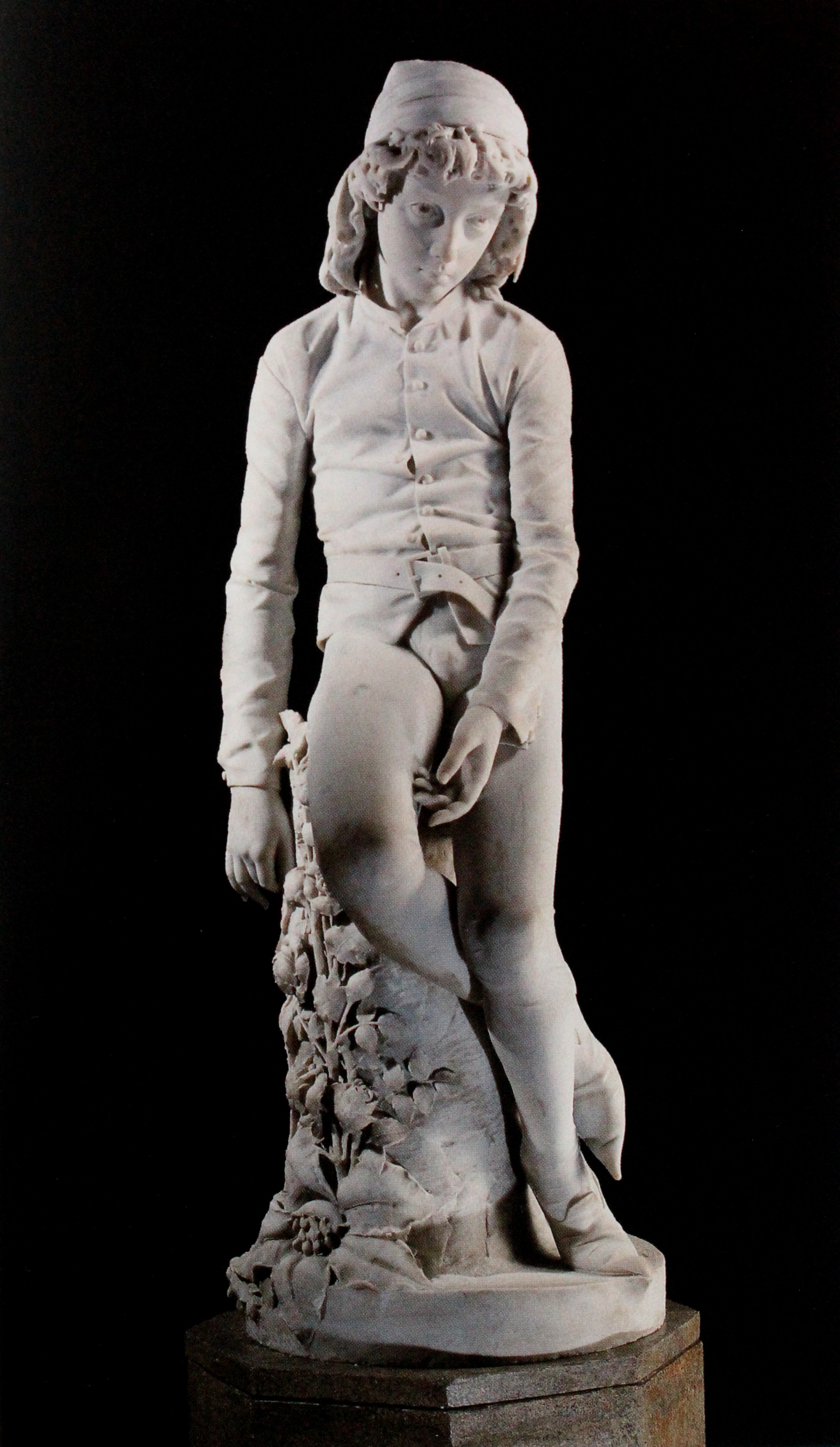
Dantino (1865)

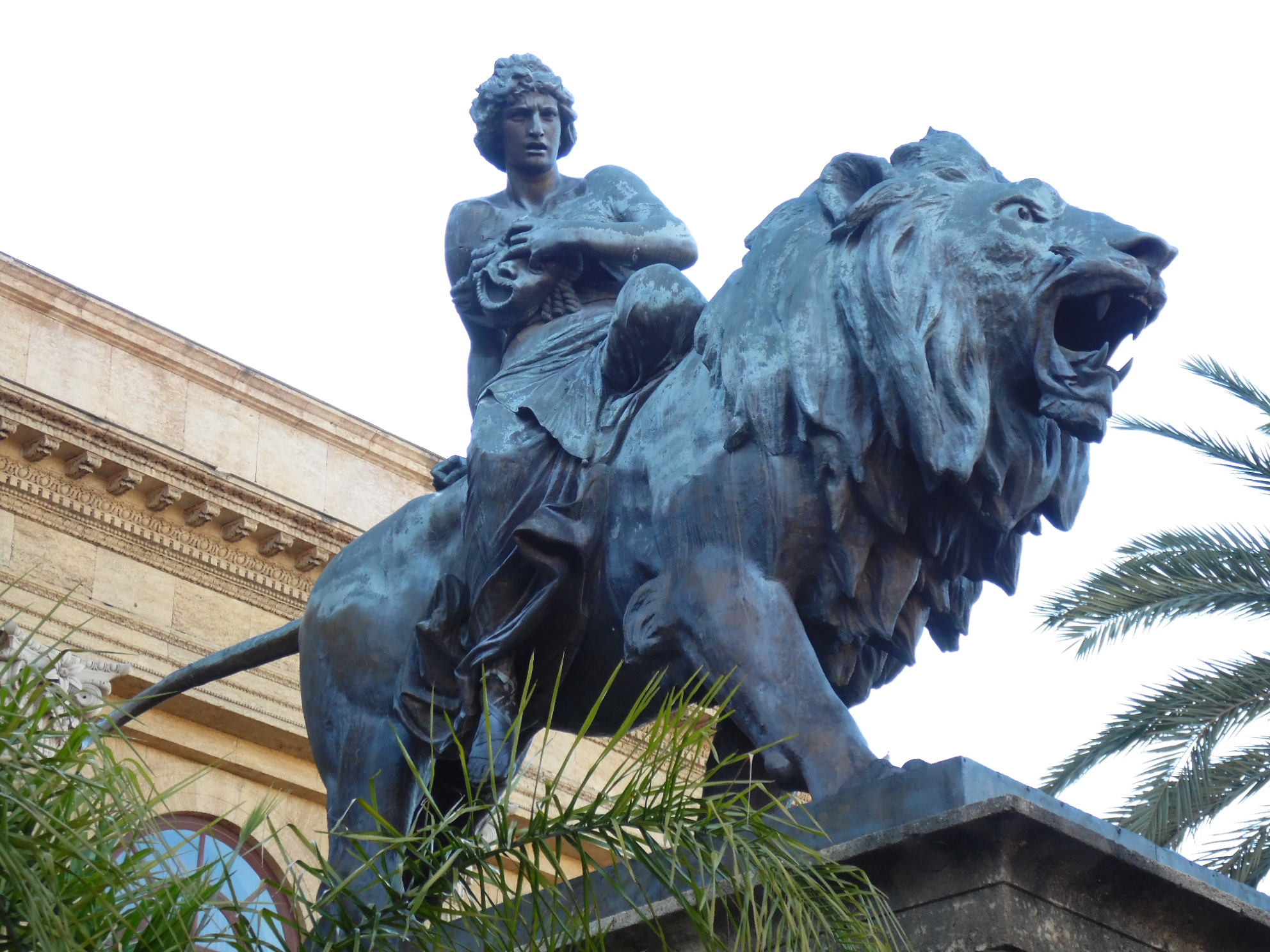
La Tragedia outside Teatro Massimo, Palermo

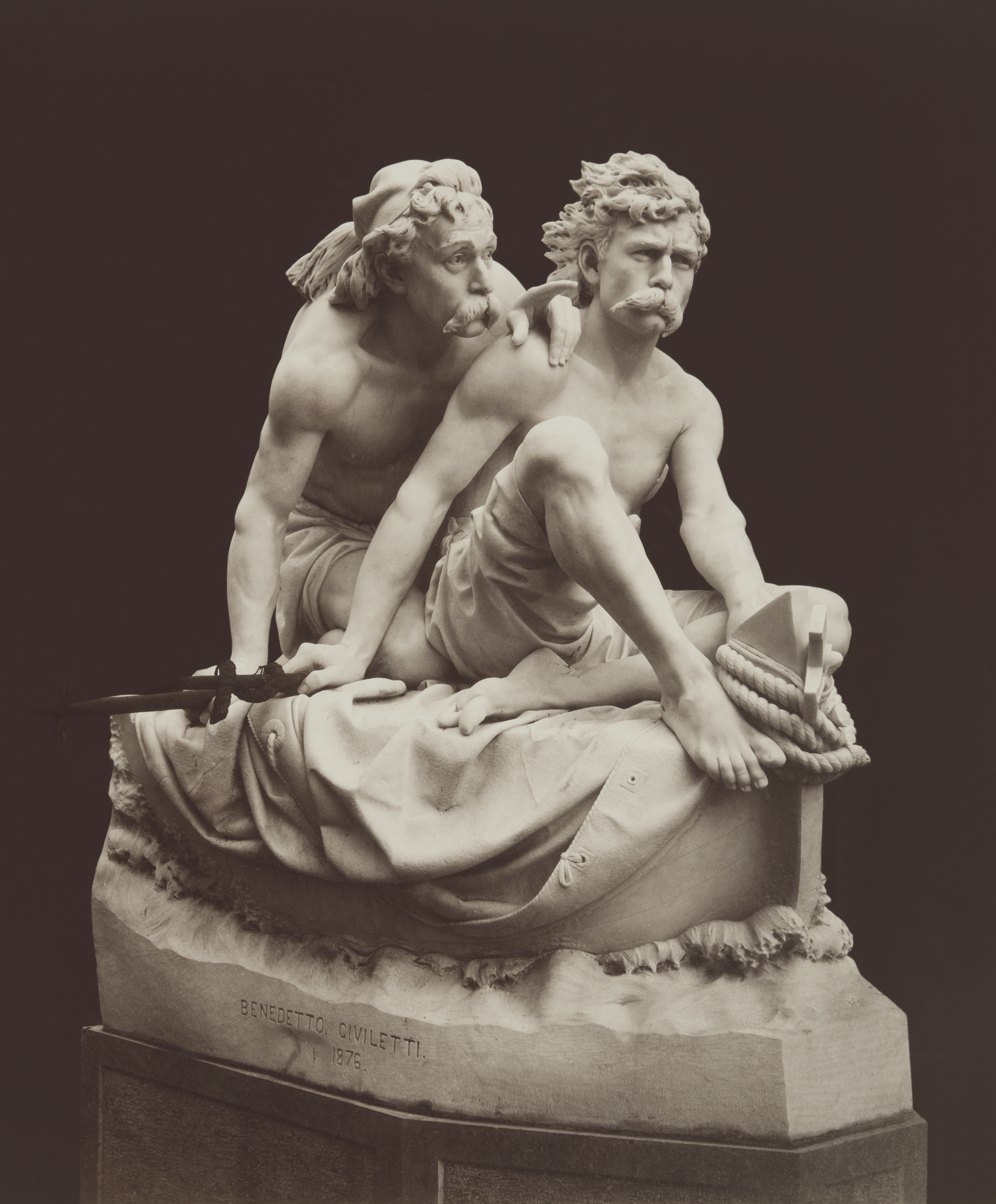
Kanaris a Scio, Piersanti Mattarella Park, Palermo (1878)

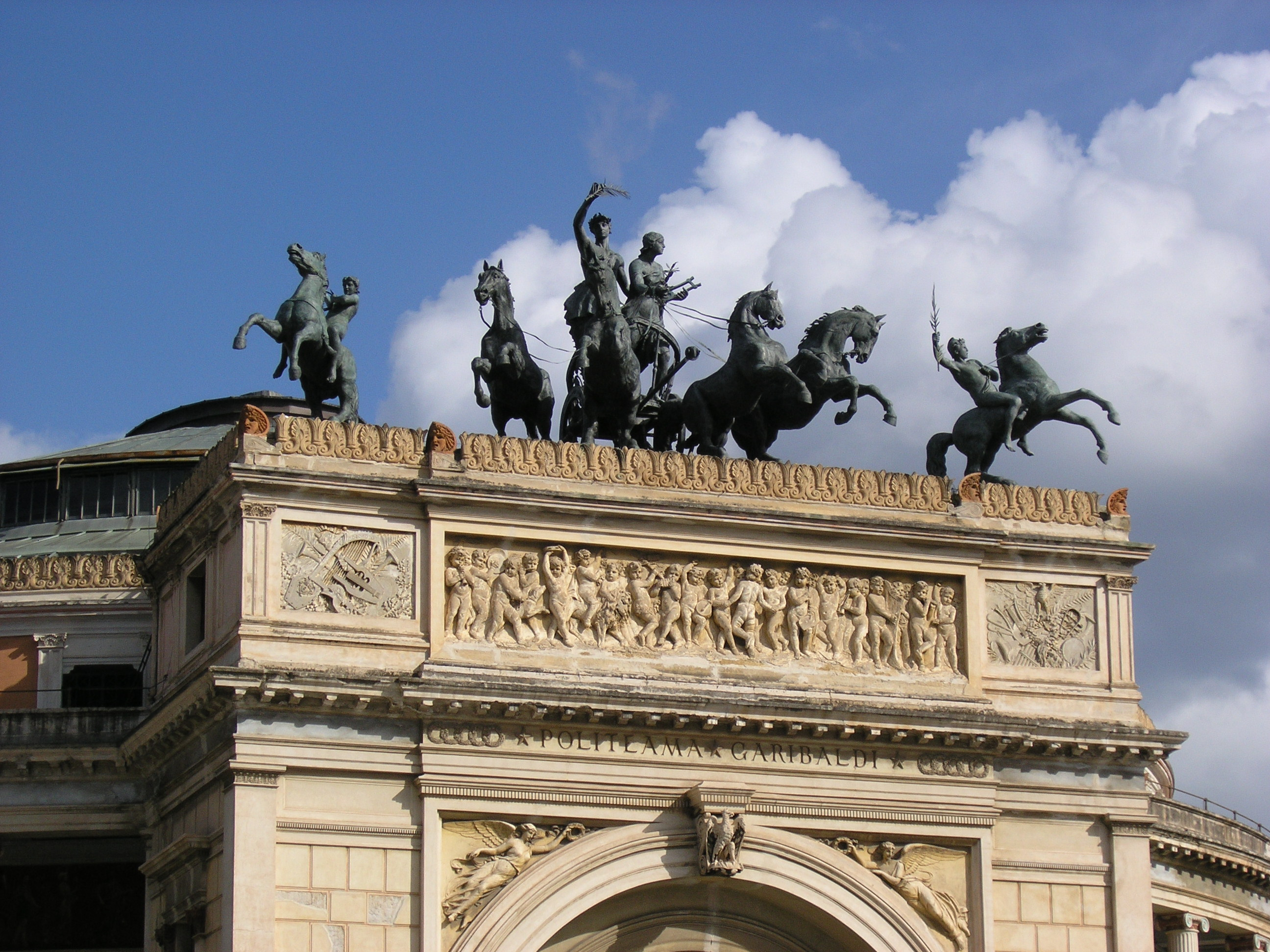
Equestrian figures flanking the Quadriga di Apollo by Mario Rutelli atop Teatro Politeama, Palermo

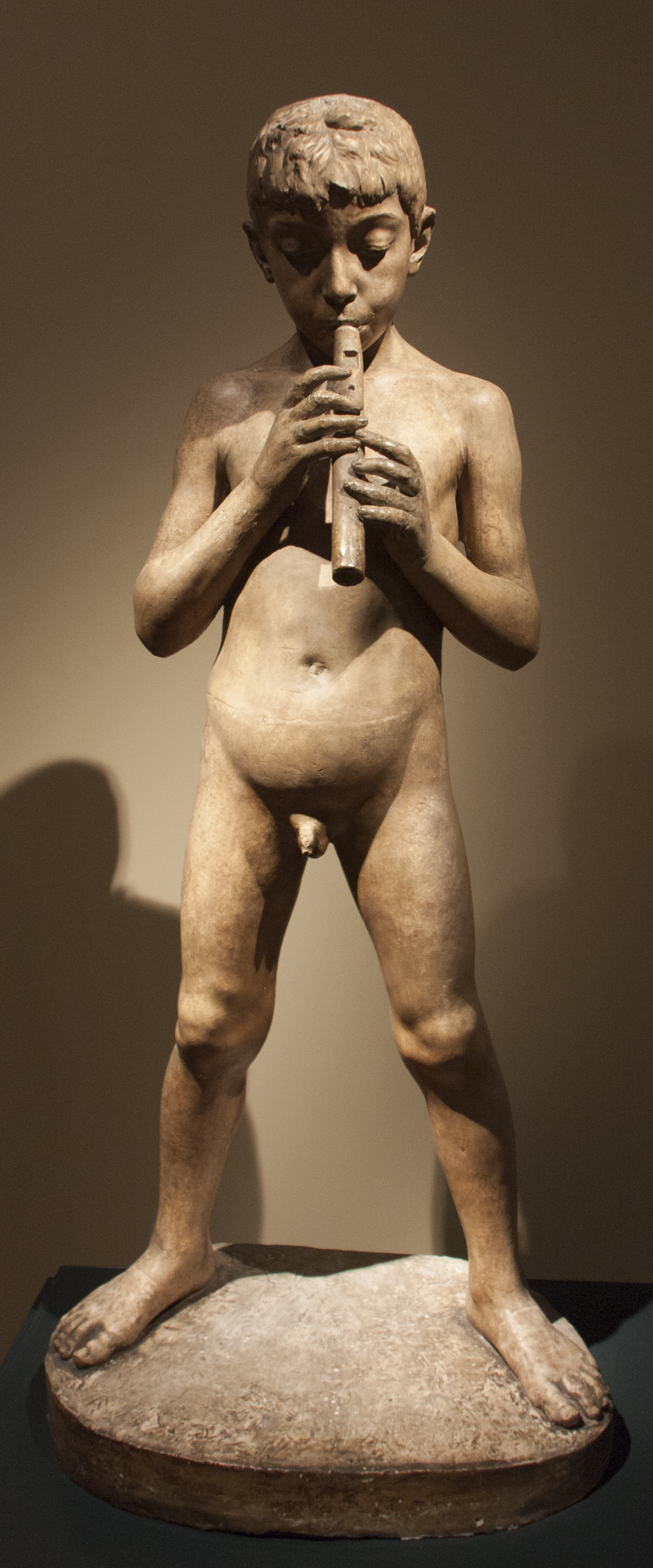
Il Pifferaio (ca. 1890)

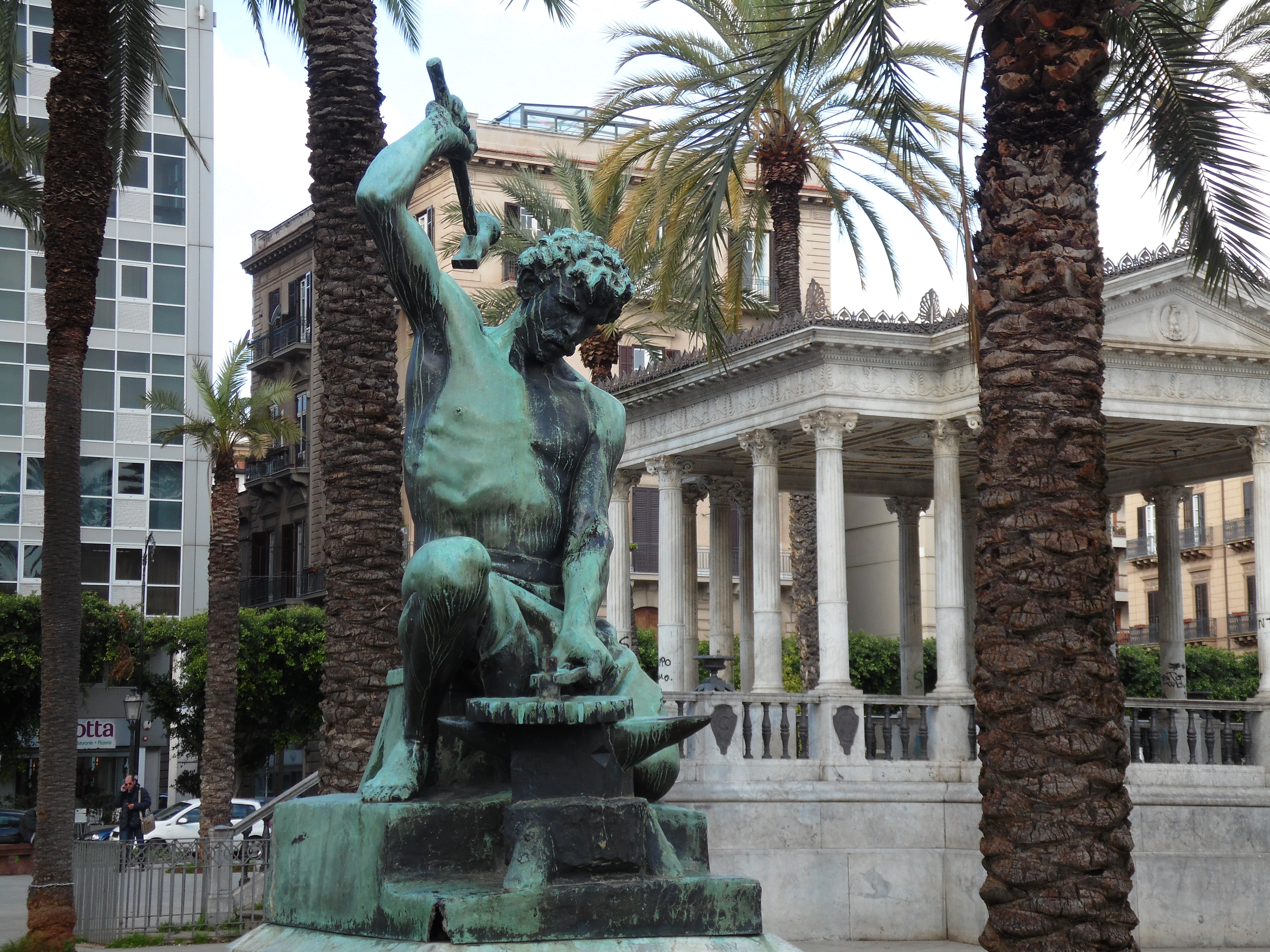
Lavoro (1895)
