= Teatro Politeama, Palermo =

Theatre in Palermo, Italy

Coordinates: 38.1250°N 13.3567°E

Politeama Theatre
- Teatro Politeama
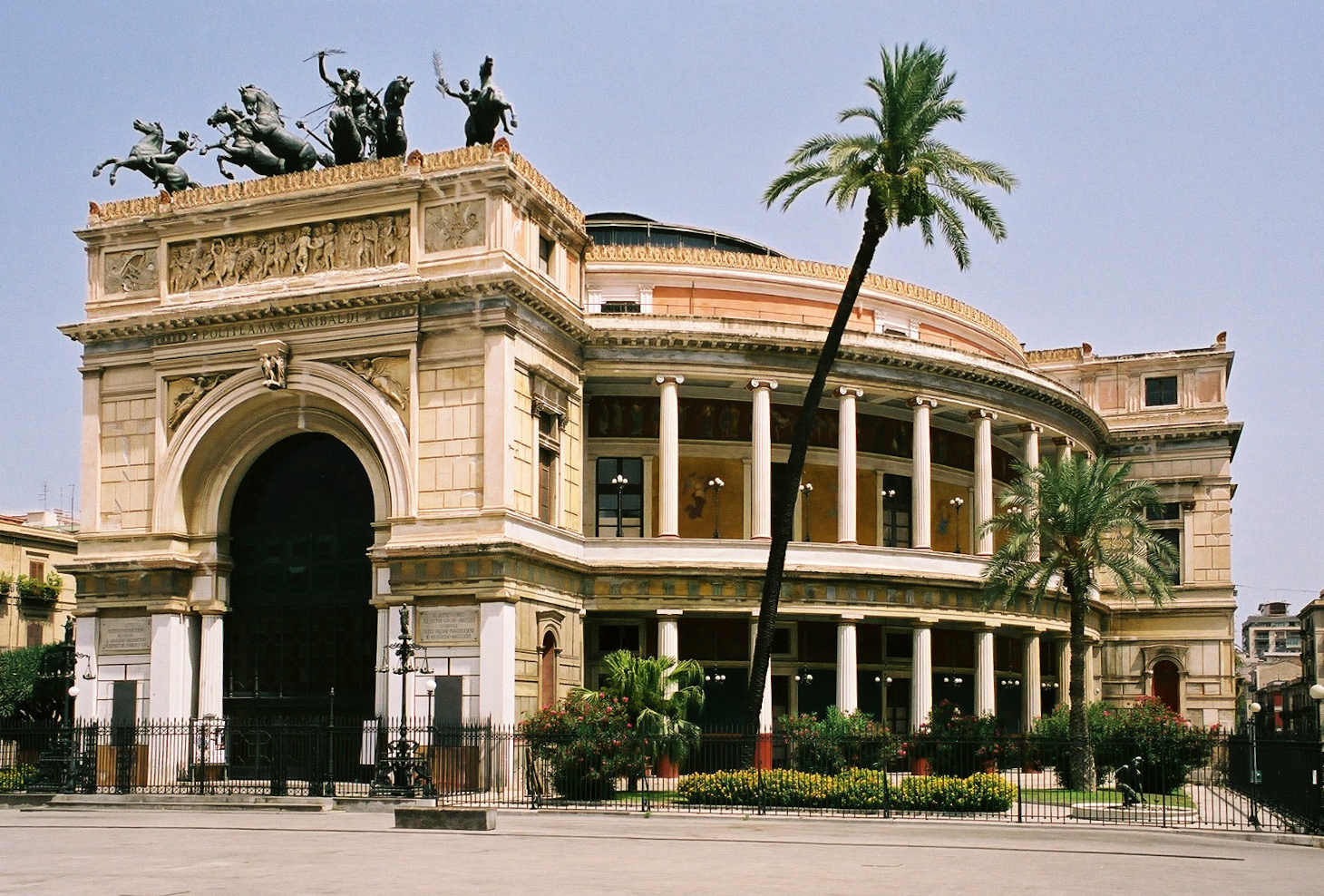
- Exterior of the Teatro Politeama
- Interactive map of Politeama Theatre
- Full name: Teatro Politeama Garibaldi
- Address: Piazza Ruggero Settimo, 15
- Location: Palermo, Italy
- Owner: Comune of Palermo
- Capacity: 950

Construction
- Built: 1865–1917
- Opened: 1874
- Architect: Giuseppe Damiani Almeyda

Website
- www.orchestrasinfonicasiciliana.it

The Politeama Theatre (Italian: Teatro Politeama), complete name Teatro Politeama Garibaldi is a theatre of Palermo. It is located in the central Piazza Ruggero Settimo and represents the second most important theatre of the city after the Teatro Massimo. It houses the Orchestra Sinfonica Siciliana.

== History ==
In 1864 the municipality of Palermo launched an international competition for the construction of a monumental opera house (the Teatro Massimo) and, a year later, an internal competition for the construction of a diurnal multi-purpose theatre (hence the name "Politeama" from the Greek language).

The architectural project was assigned to Giuseppe Damiani Almeyda. The theatre would have to be built on the border of the monumental structure of Palermo, as an ideal point of reference of the city's expansion. Therefore, unlike the "aristocratic" Teatro Massimo, the Politeama would have to house more popular shows (operetta, festivals, equestrian shows, etc.).

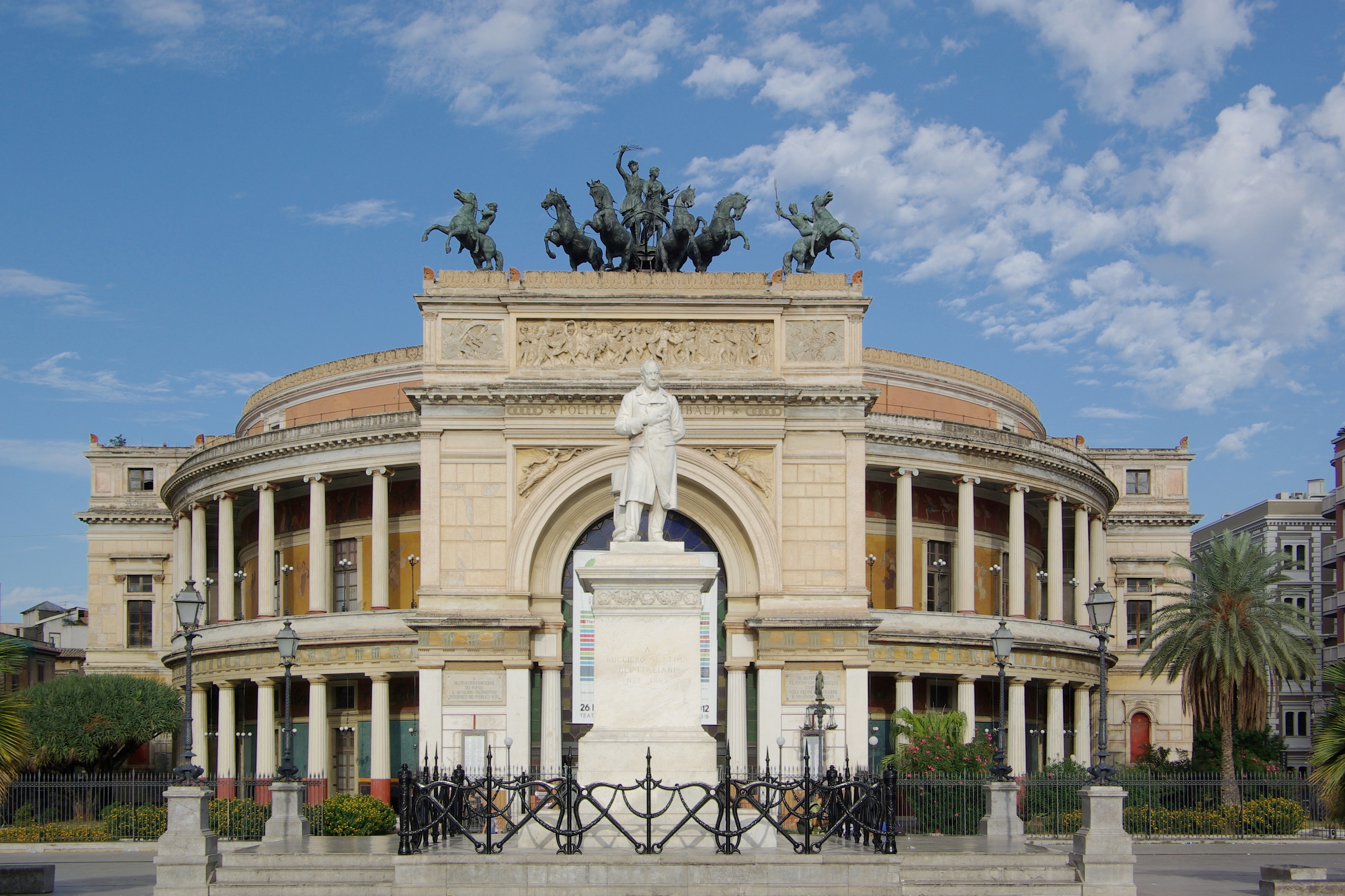
Frontal view with the statue of Ruggero Settimo

Then, it was decided to erect a large opencast amphitheatre at the beginning of Viale della Libertà. In 1865 the contract with the construction company Galland was signed, but the construction started only in 1867. A year later the project was modified because it was decided to transform the amphitheatre into a real theatrical house. In the meantime, the work slow down due to problems that have arisen between the municipality and the Galland company.

In 1869 the municipality decided to name the building after Gioachino Rossini, but later this intention was dismissed. On 7 June 1874 the theatre was inaugurated with the opera I Capuleti e i Montecchi of Vincenzo Bellini. However, the building wasn't complete yet. During the following years the name of the building was simply "Teatro Municipale Politeama". In 1882 Giuseppe Garibaldi died and the theatre was named after him.

Even though the covering had been made in 1877 by the Fonderia Oretea, the last interventions were completed in 1891, when Palermo hosted the Esposizione Nazionale. At that time dates back the official opening in the presence of King Umberto I of Italy and of Queen Margherita. On that occasion Francesco Tamagno was the protagonist of Giuseppe Verdi's Otello.

Between 1910 and 2006 the foyer of the theatre was home of the Galleria d'arte moderna di Palermo. The Politeama is the headquarters of the Orchestra Sinfonica Siciliana since 2001.

== Description ==
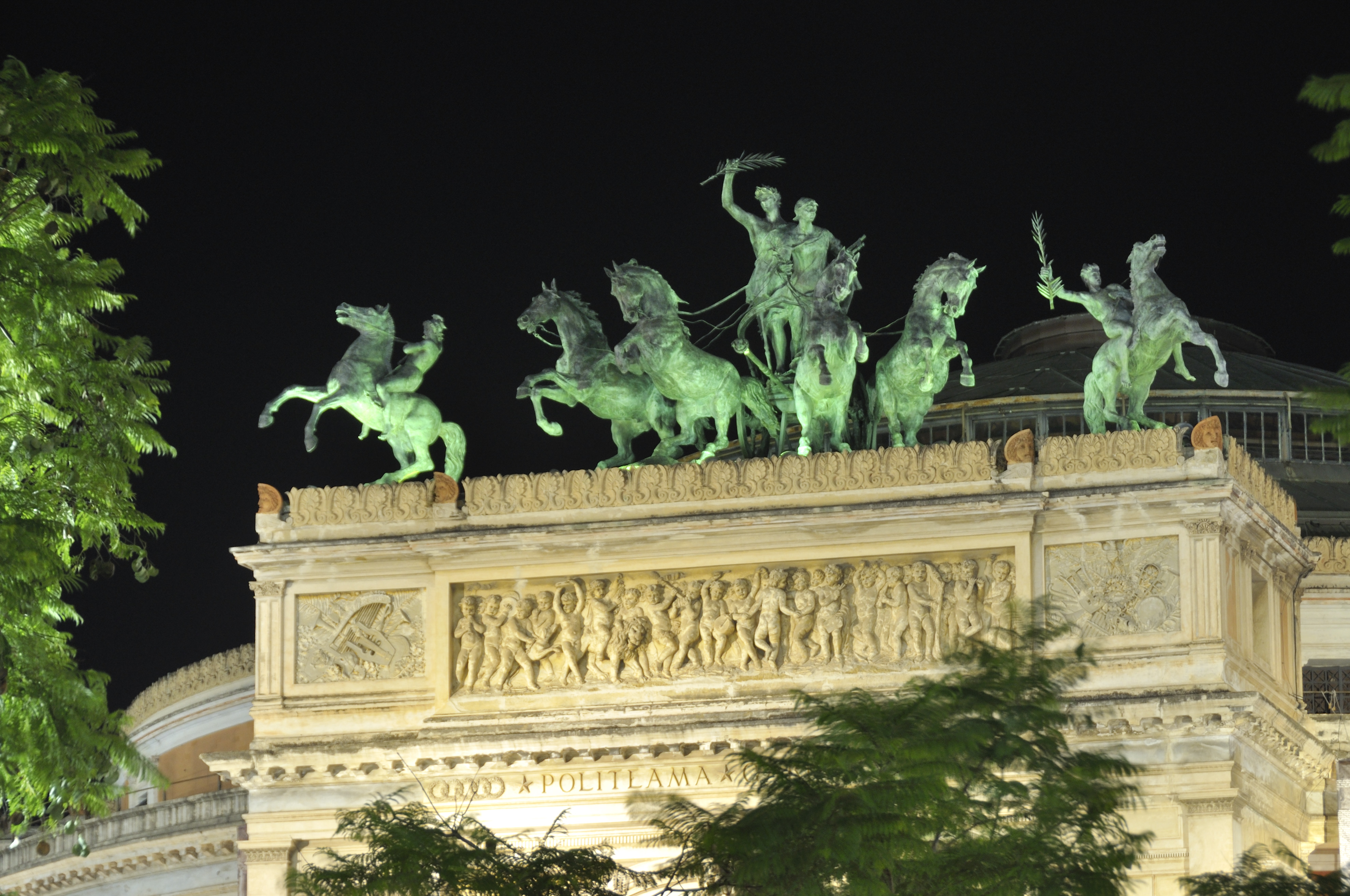
Nocturnal view of the quadriga

The building is an important example of Neoclassical architecture. It has a large entrance by way of triumphal arch topped by the bronze quadriga designed by Mario Rutelli. This quadriga depicts the "Triumph of Apollo and Euterpe" flanked by two statues of knights on horseback, representation of the "Olympic Games", work of Benedetto Civiletti. On both sides of the entrance there are commemorative plaques recording the epigraphs dictated by the historian Isidoro La Lumia. At the top there are two bass reliefs depicting the "Fames" draw by the painter Giuseppe Pensabene and another, under the quadriga, depicting little angels, work of Mario Rutelli.

Around the entrance a semicircular structure develops with two orders of colonnade. A rich polychrome decoration, both within and outside the theatre, was made by eminent local painters like Nicolò Giannone, Luigi Di Giovanni, Michele Corteggiani, Giuseppe Enea, Rocco Lentini, Enrico Cavallaro, Carmelo Giarrizzo, Francesco Padovano, Giovanni Nicolini and Gustavo Mancinelli. In the lateral gardens there are the sculptures of a Bacchante (work of Valerio Villareale), of a Sylph (work of Benedetto De Lisi) and of David (work of Antonio Ugo).

== Gallery ==
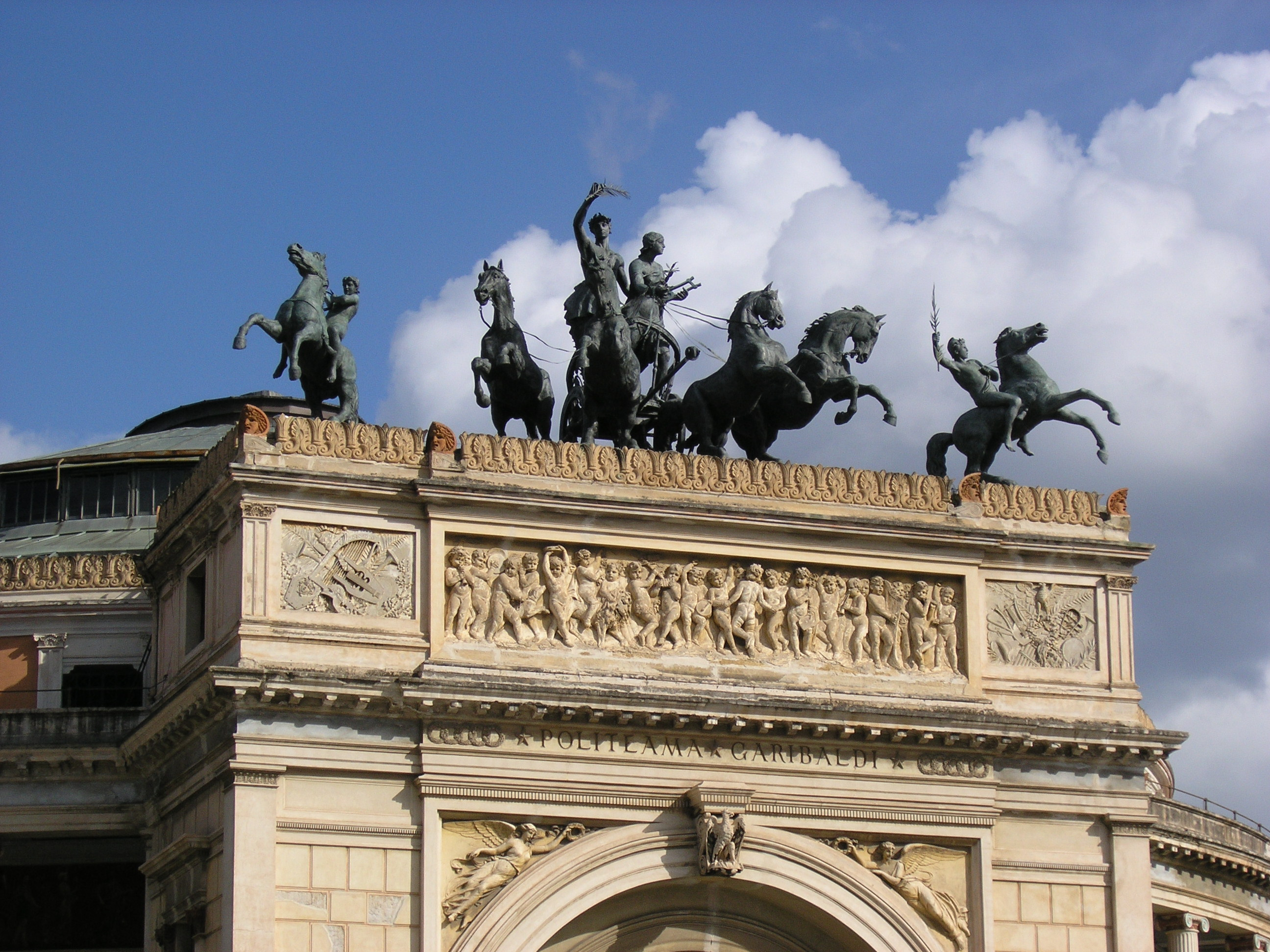
Quadriga with flanking knights

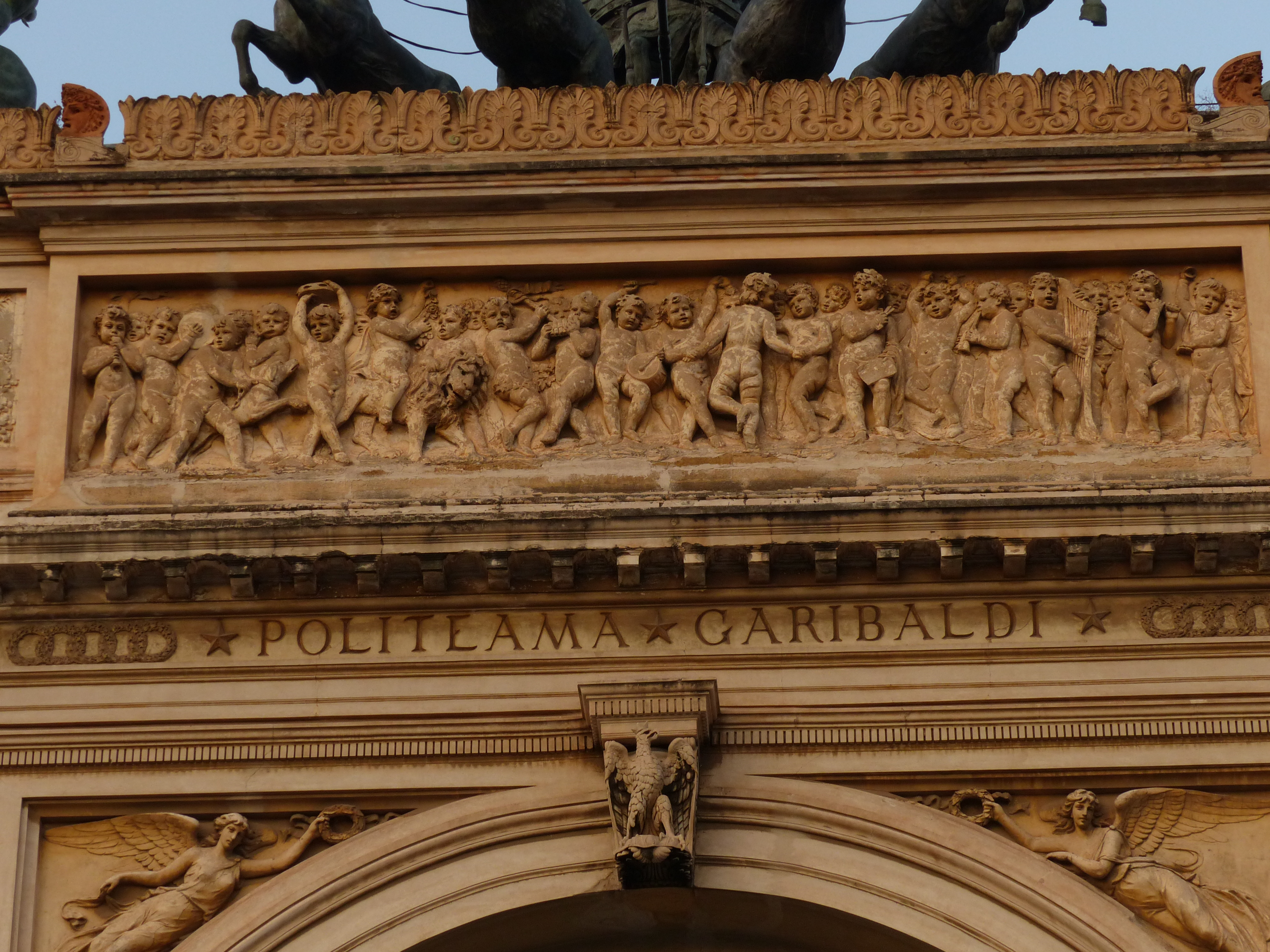
Reliefs

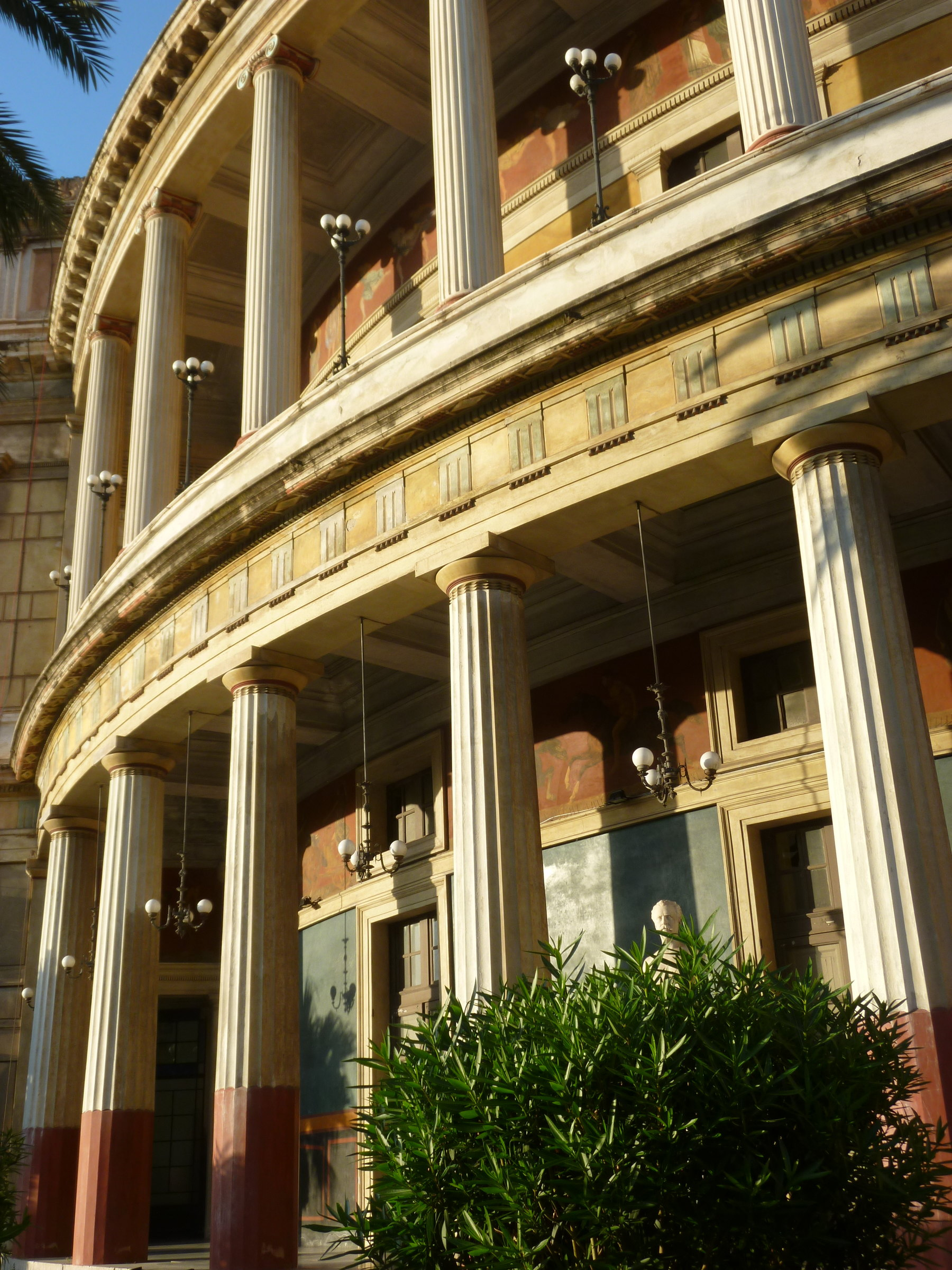
Colonnades

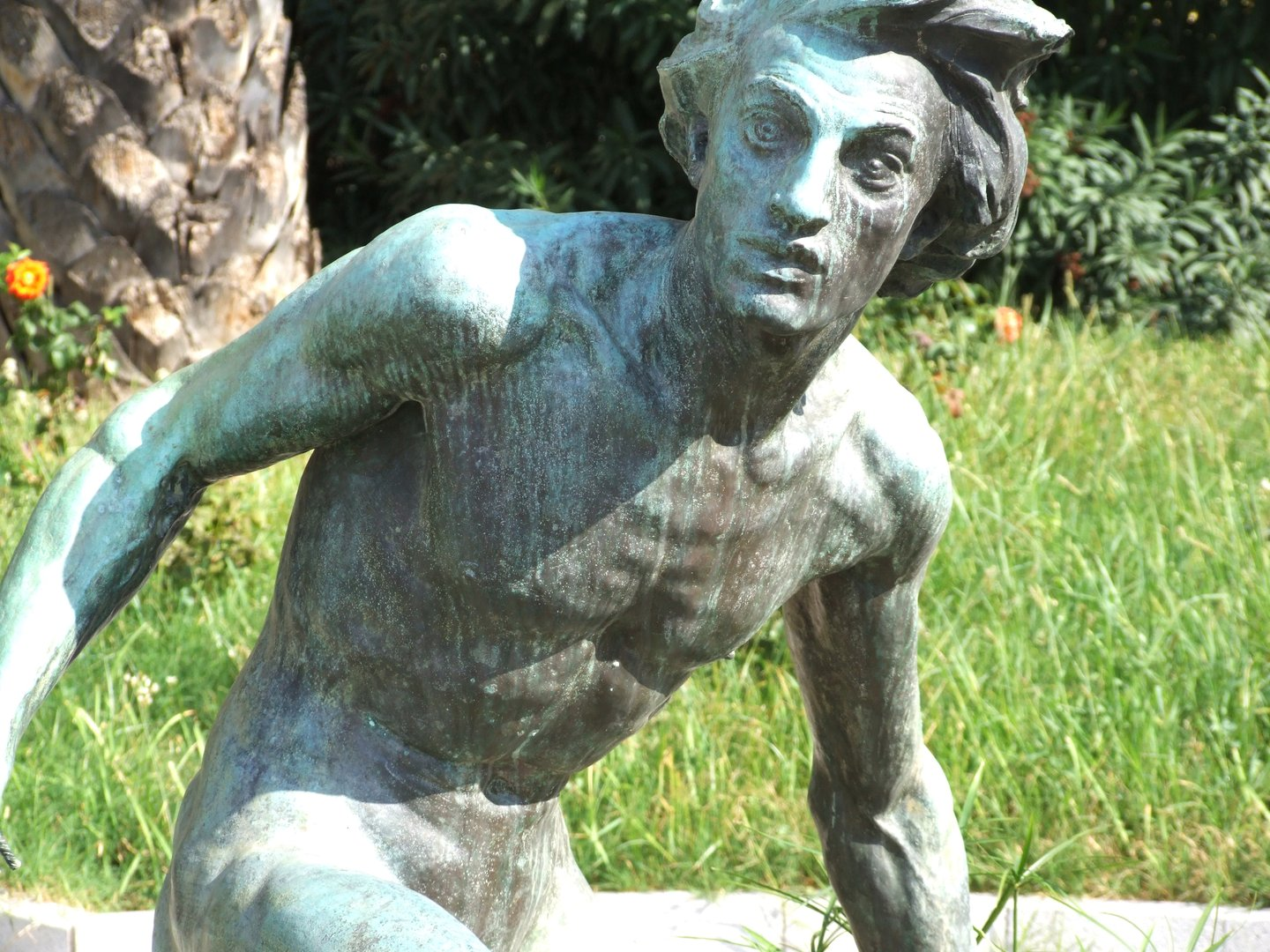
David of Antonio Ugo

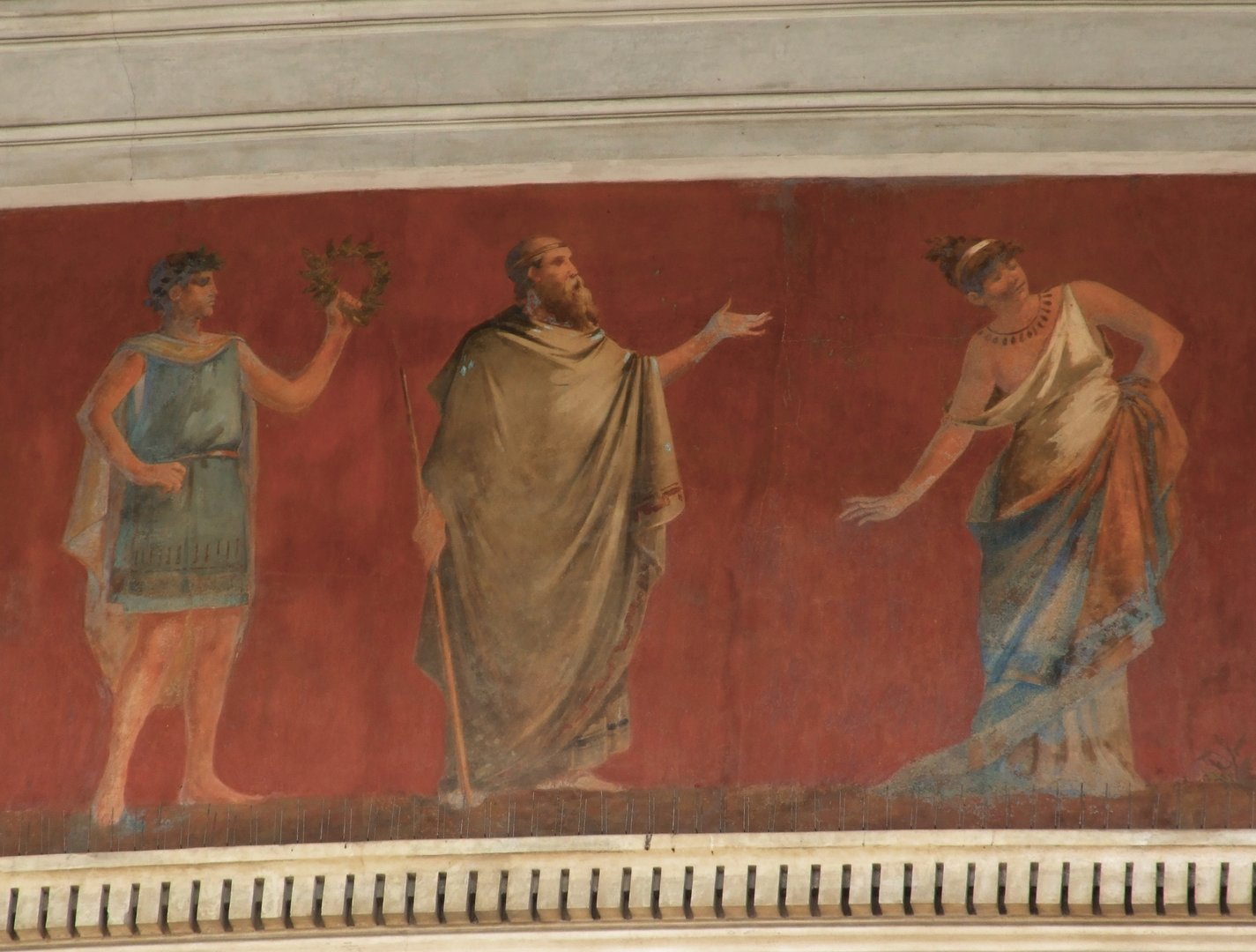
Painting

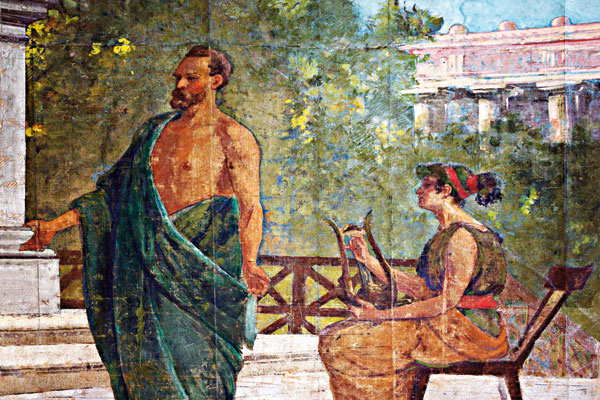
Painting

== See also ==
- Piazza Ruggero Settimo
- Piazza Castelnuovo
- Teatro Massimo
- Teatro Politeama, Lisbon
