= Piazza Ruggero Settimo =

Public square in Palermo, Italy

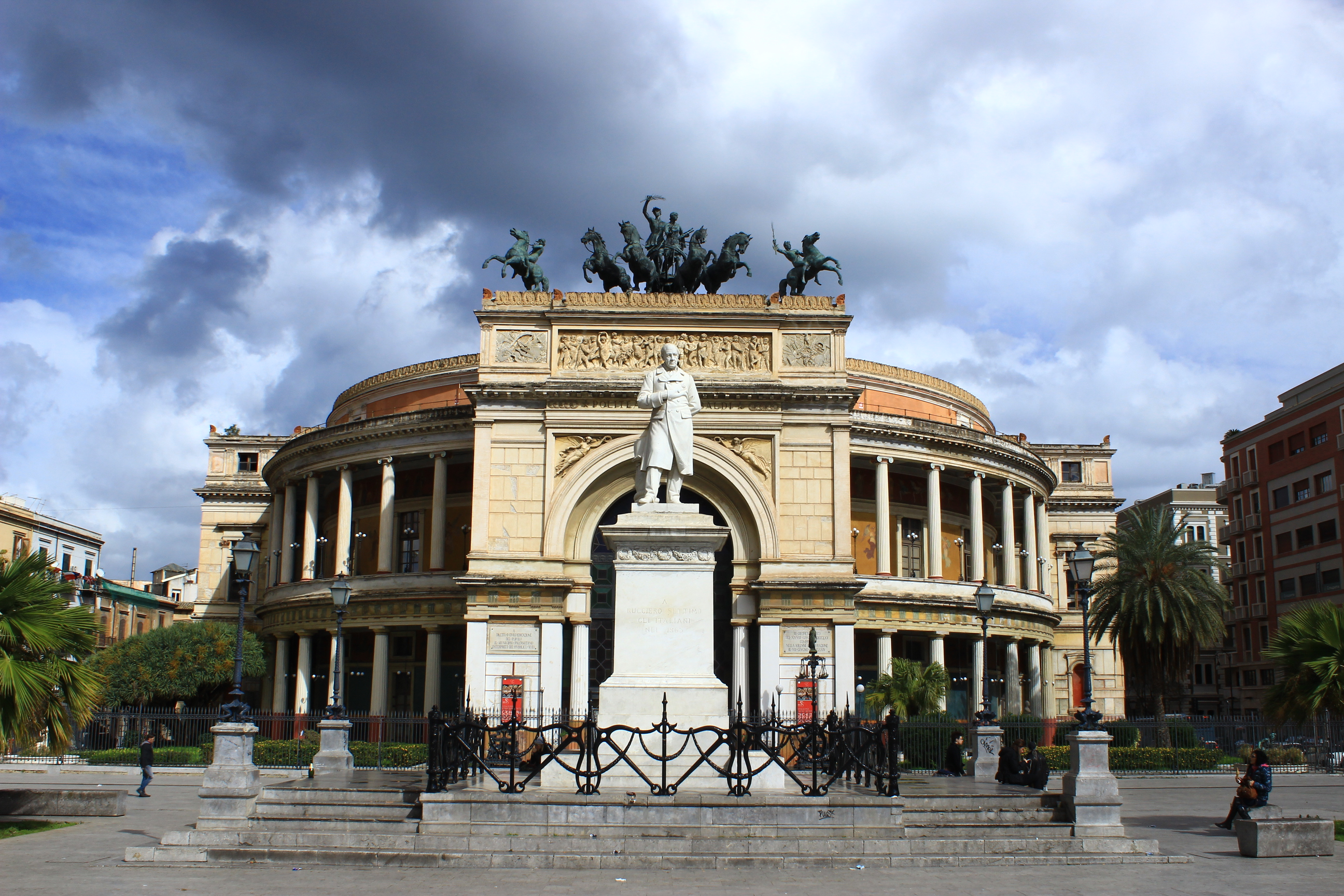
- Teatro Politeama and Monument to Ruggero Settimo
- Interactive map of Piazza Ruggero Settimo
- Location: Palermo, Sicily, Italy
- Coordinates: 38°07′30.5″N 13°21′24″E

Piazza Ruggero Settimo is a square of Palermo. Along with the contiguous Piazza Castelnuovo, it forms a single urban space, commonly called Piazza Politeama, by virtue of the presence of Teatro Politeama, the second most important theatre of the city after Teatro Massimo. The square is located between Via Ruggero Settimo and Viale della Libertà, near the historic centre of Palermo, and represents one of the most popular city's squares.

It is dedicated to the Sicilian patriot Ruggero Settimo and a monument depicting him (work of Benedetto De Lisi) is located at the centre of the square.

== See also ==
- Piazza Castelnuovo
- Teatro Politeama
