= Giardino Inglese (Palermo) =

Public park in Palermo, Italy

Coordinates: 38°07′57″N 13°21′07″E

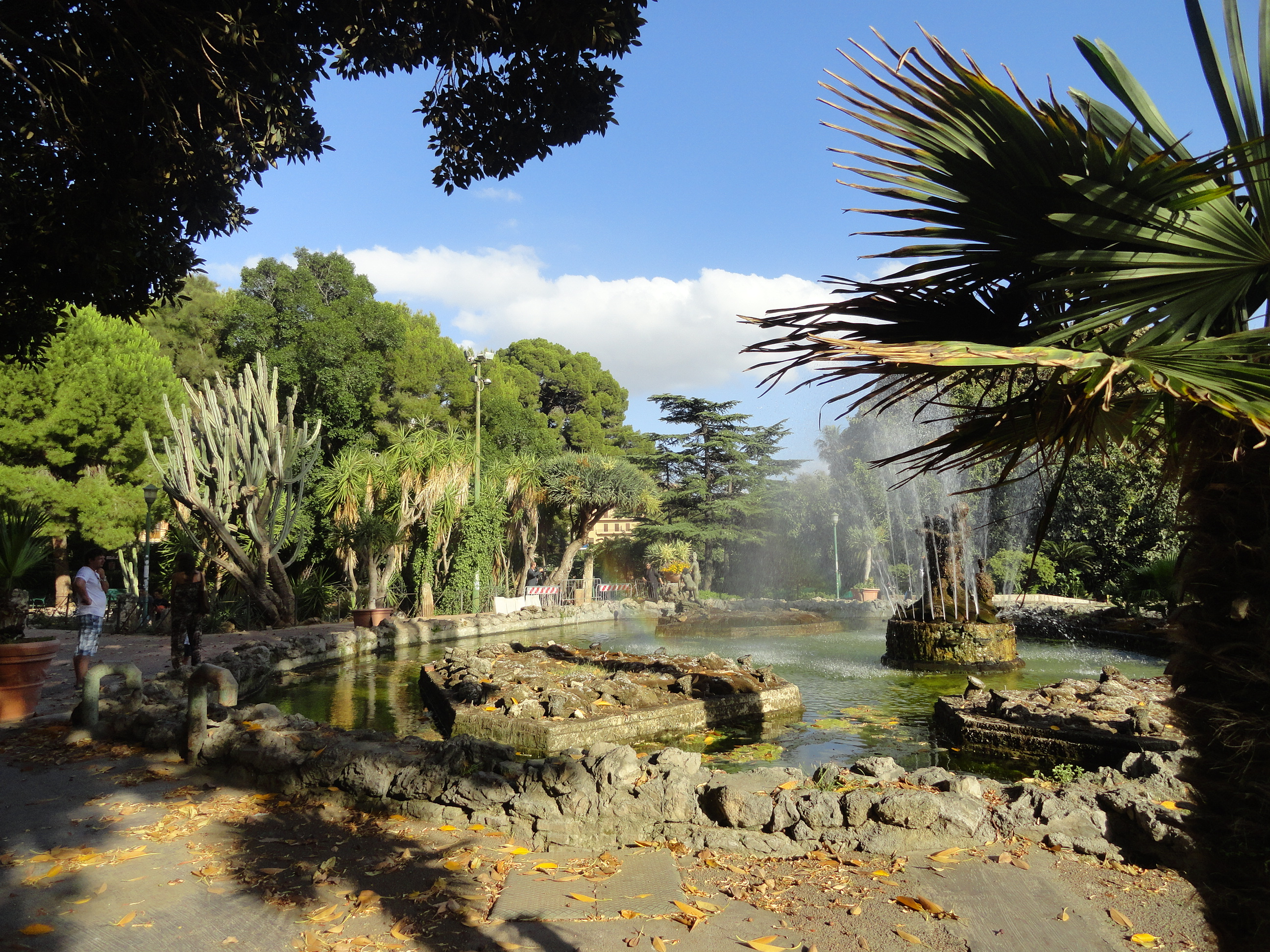
Fountain in the Giardino Inglese

The Piersanti Mattarella Park (Italian: Parco Piersanti Mattarella), formerly the English Garden (Giardino Inglese), is a public park in Palermo designed in 1851 by the architect Giovan Battista Filippo Basile.

== History ==
The garden was designed by Giovan Battista Filippo Basile in 1851 following a pattern very popular in the 19th century, that is not to create a measured and geometric space (the so-called Italian-style garden) but to follow the natural shapes and irregularities of the ground giving it a more natural air by creating an English-style garden (hence the name "English garden").

To make the atmosphere even more suggestive and more exotic, according to the taste of the period, plants from all over the world were added, chosen in collaboration with botanist Vincenzo Tineo, who was at the time the Director of the Botanical Garden of Palermo.

== Gallery ==
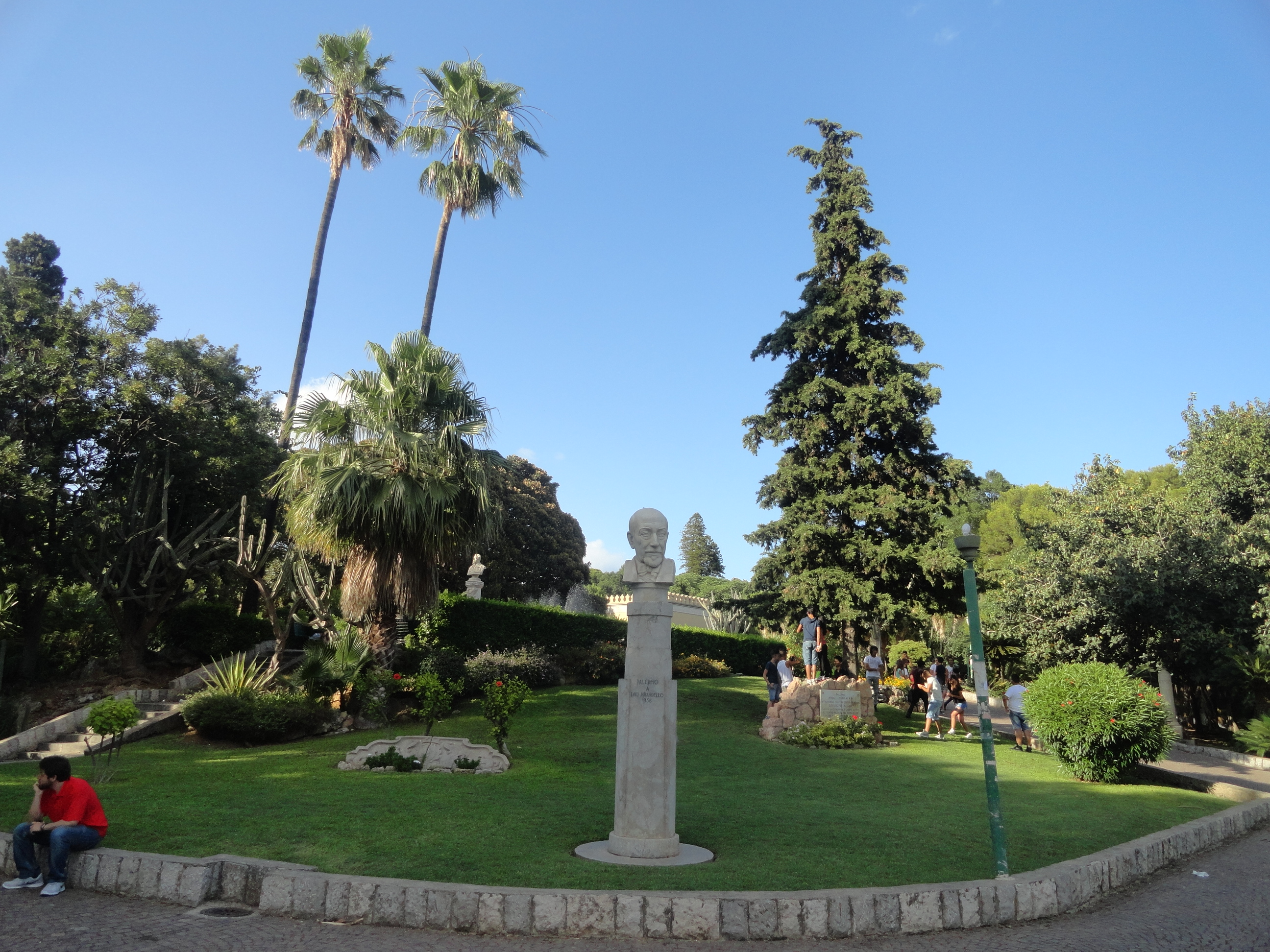
Bust of Luigi Pirandello.

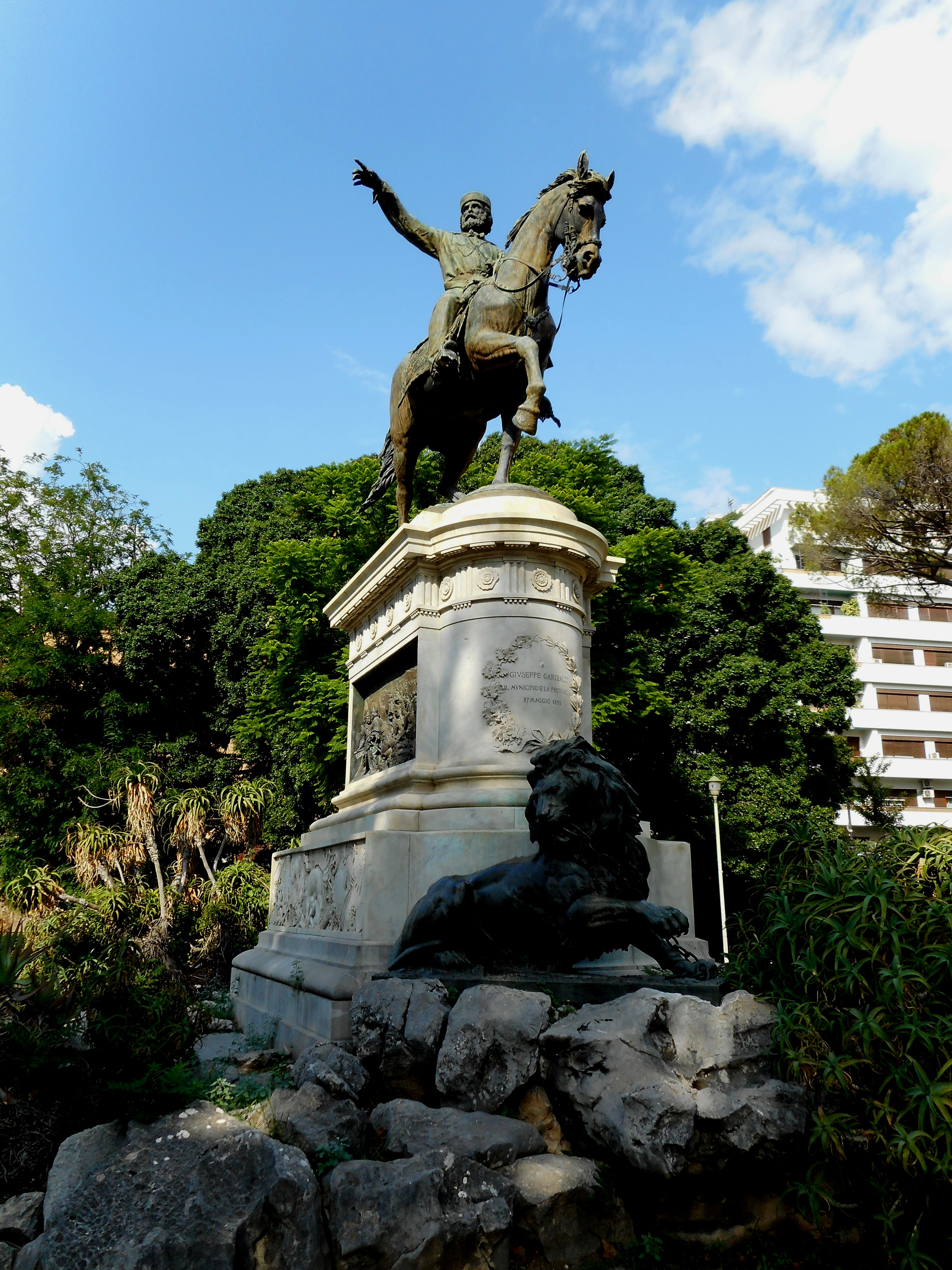
Equestrian monument of Giuseppe Garibaldi in the Villa Falcone-Morvillo.

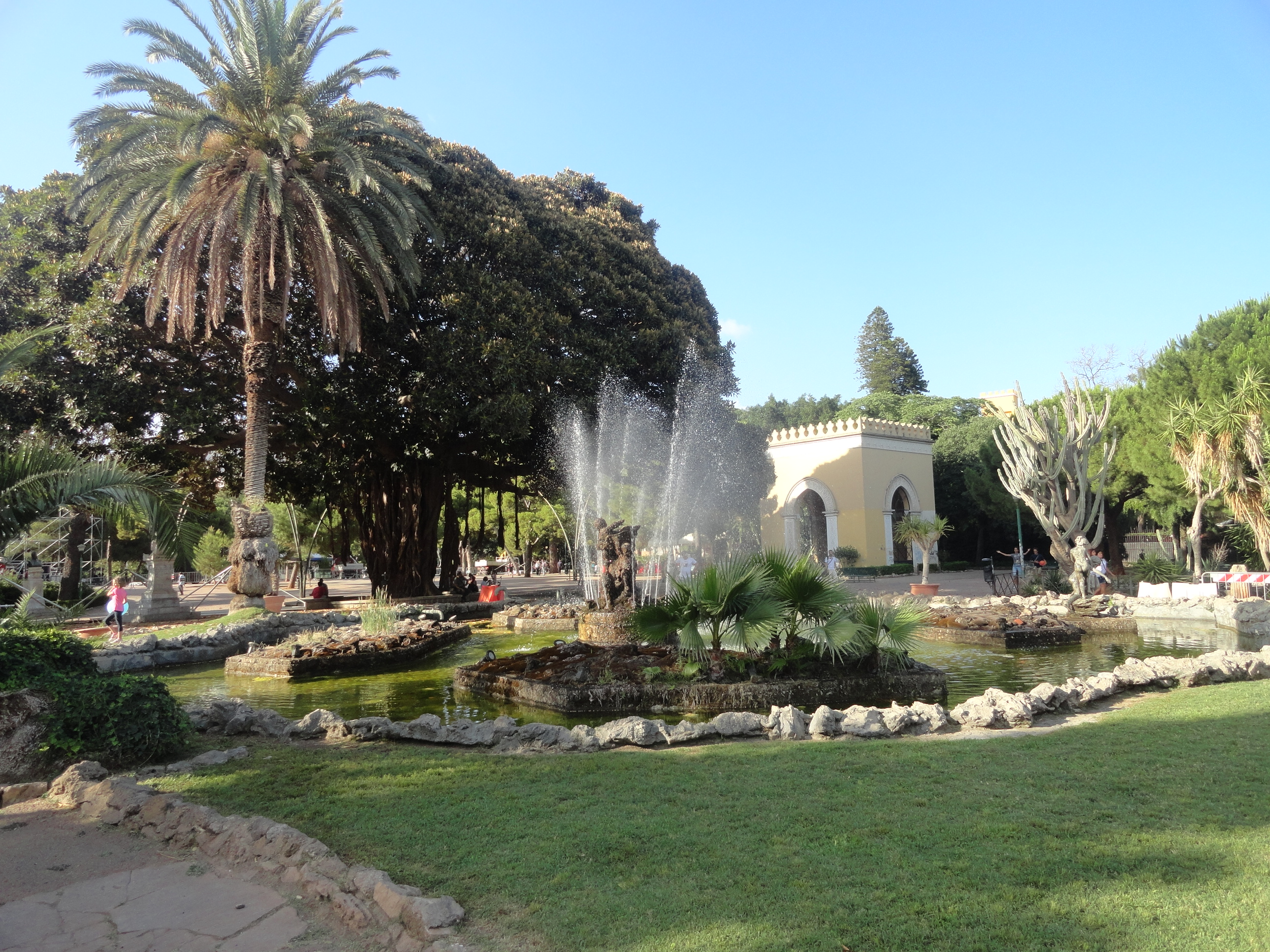
A view at the fountain.

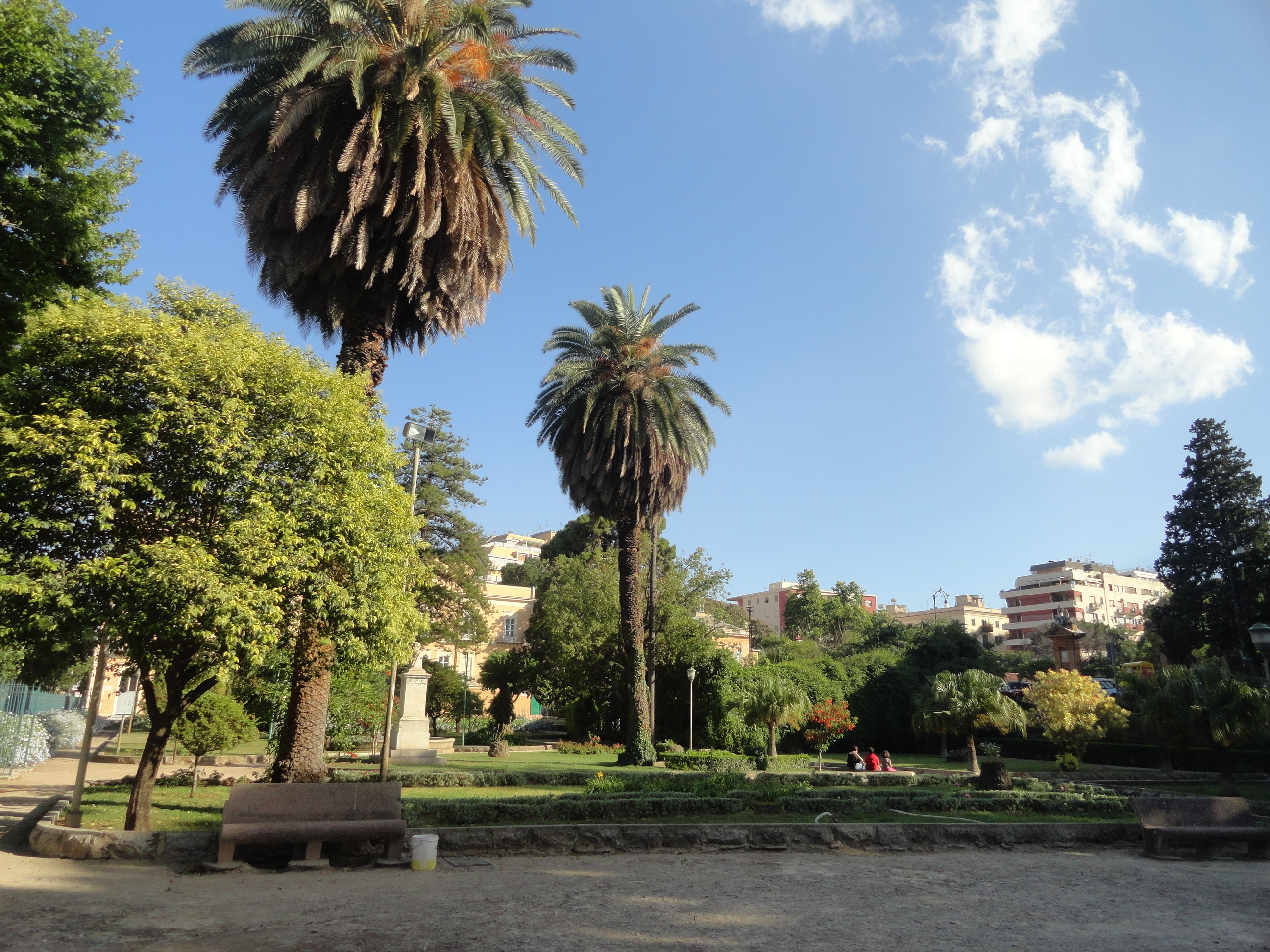
A view from historical Villa Garibaldi, now intitled to Giovanni Falcone and Francesca Morvillo as Villa Falcone-Morvillo.

== See also ==
- Kanaris a Scio (sculpture)
- Villa Giulia
