= Angelo Brofferio =

Italian poet and politician

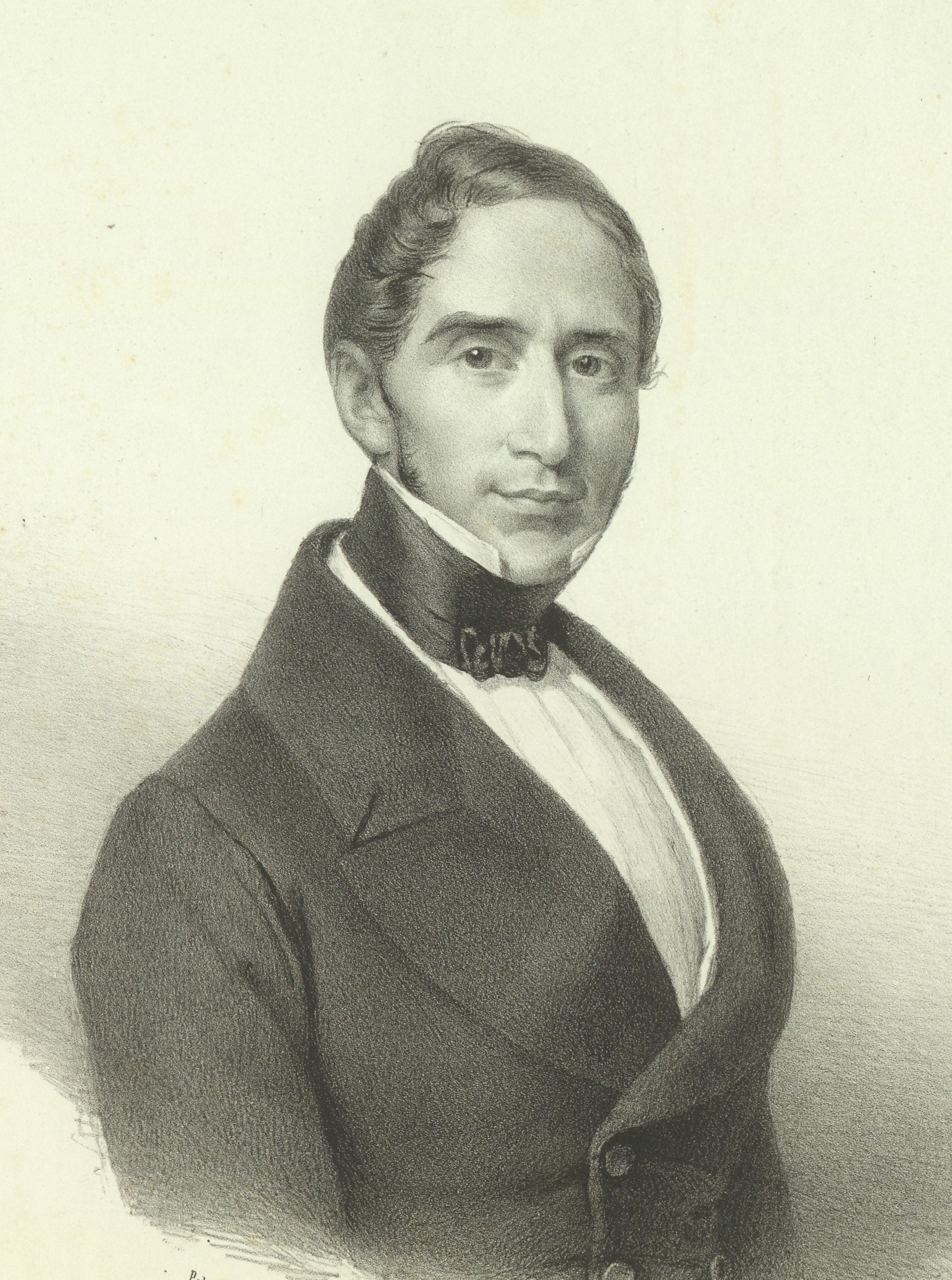
- Angelo Brofferio, 1848

Personal details
- Born: 6 December 1802 Castelnuovo Calcea, French Republic
- Died: 25 May 1866 (aged 63) Minusio, Swiss Confederation
- Spouse: Felicie Perret
- Education: University of Turin
- Profession: Poet, politician, writer

Angelo Brofferio (6 December 1802 – 25 May 1866) was a Piedmontese and Italian poet and politician, active during the period of Italian unification.

== Literary works ==
Brofferio was known as "the Piedmontese Béranger". His poem entitled Canzoni piemontesi, written in Piedmontese, is among his most noteworthy works.

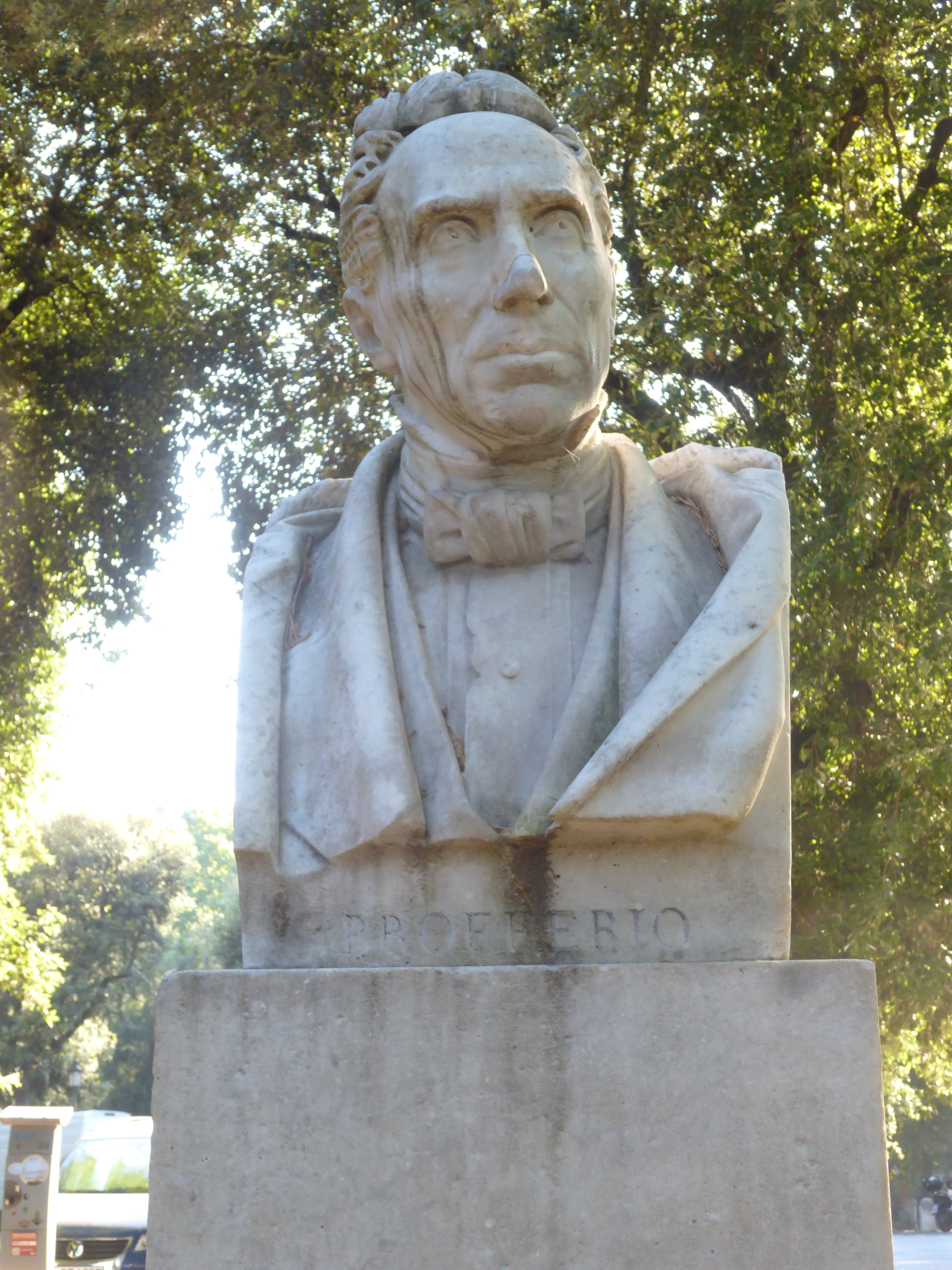
Bust of Angelo Brofferio at the Pincian Hill in Rome

=== Tragedies ===
- Su morre
- Eudossia
- Idomeneo
- Vitige re dei Goti
- Il vampiro
- Mio cugino
- Salvator Rosa
- Il tartufo politico

=== Other works ===
- Tradizioni italiane
- Scene elleniche
- Storia delle rivoluzioni italiane dal 1821 al 1848
- Storia del Piemonte dal 1814 ai giorni nostri
- Storia del parlamento subalpino
- I miei tempi

== See also ==
- Unification of Italy
