= USS LSM-462 =

LSM-1-class landing ship medium

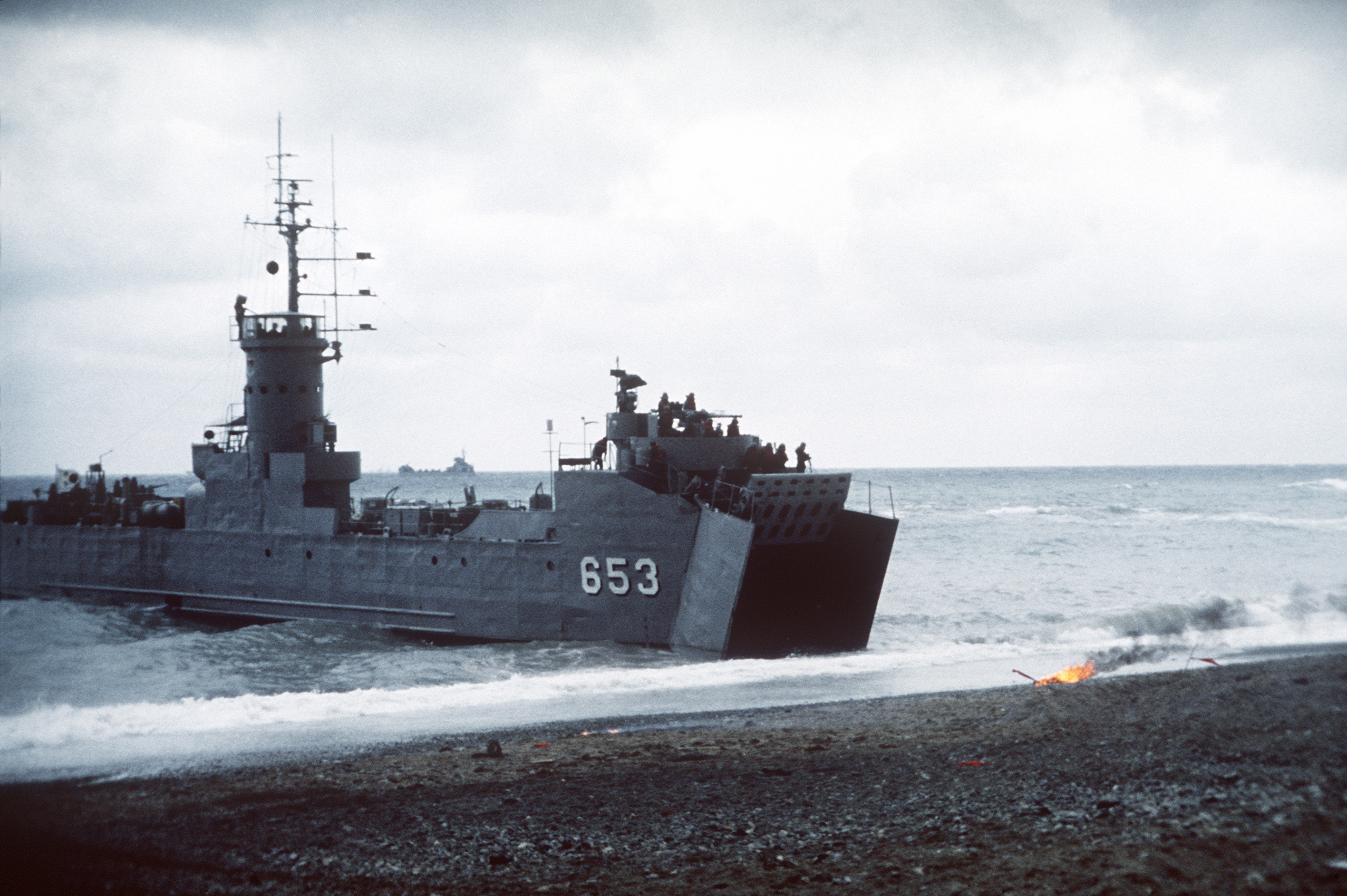
- ROKS Gadeok on 1 March 1982

History

United States
- Name: LSM-462
- Builder: Brown Shipbuilding Co., Houston
- Laid down: 13 January 1945
- Launched: 3 February 1945
- Commissioned: 4 March 1945
- Decommissioned: 16 February 1955
- Stricken: 15 November 1974
- Honors and awards: See Awards
- Fate: Transferred to South Korea, 16 February 1955

History

South Korea
- Name: Gadeok; (가덕)
- Namesake: Gadeok
- Acquired: 16 February 1955
- Commissioned: 16 February 1955
- Decommissioned: 31 March 1997
- Reclassified: LSM-653
- Identification: Pennant number: LSM-605
- Fate: Unknown

General characteristics
- Class & type: LSM-1-class landing ship medium
- Displacement: 520 long tons (528 t) light; 743 long tons (755 t) landing; 1,095 long tons (1,113 t) full load
- Length: 203 ft 6 in (62.03 m) o/a
- Beam: 34 ft 6 in (10.52 m)
- Draft: 3 ft 6 in (1.07 m) forward; 7 ft 8 in (2.34 m) aft; Fully loaded : 6 ft 4 in (1.93 m) forward; 8 ft 3 in (2.51 m) aft
- Propulsion: 2 × Fairbanks-Morse (model 38D81/8X10, reversible with hydraulic clutch) diesels. Direct drive with 1,440 bhp (1,074 kW) each @ 720 rpm, twin screws
- Speed: 13.2 knots (15.2 mph; 24.4 km/h)
- Range: 4,900 nmi (9,100 km) at 12 kn (22 km/h)
- Capacity: 5 medium or 3 heavy tanks, or 6 LVTs, or 9 DUKWs
- Troops: 2 officers, 46 enlisted
- Complement: 5 officers, 54 enlisted
- Armament: 6 × 20 mm AA gun mounts
- Armour: 10-lb. STS splinter shield to gun mounts, pilot house and conning station

USS LSM-462 was a LSM-1-class landing ship medium in the United States Navy during World War II. She was later sold to South Korean Navy as ROKS Gadeok (LSM-605).

== Construction and career ==
LSM-462 was laid down on 13 January 1945 at Brown Shipbuilding Co., Houston, Texas. Launched on 3 February 1945 and commissioned on 4 March 1945.

=== Service in the United States ===
During World War II, LSM-462 was assigned to the Asiatic-Pacific theater. She was assigned to occupation service in the Far East from 28 September to 15 November 1945 and 16 December 1945 to 5 February 1946.

LSM-462 was decommissioned on 16 February 1955 and loaned to South Korea on the same day.

She was struck from the Navy Register.

=== Service in South Korea ===
ROKS Gadeok was acquired by the South Korean Navy on 16 February 1956 and was commissioned on the same day.

Later in her service, she was designated as LSM-653.

She participated in the Team Spirit 1982.

She was decommissioned on 31 March 1997 and her fate is unknown.

== Awards ==
LST-462 have earned the following awards:

- American Campaign Medal
- China Service Medal
- Asiatic-Pacific Campaign Medal
- World War II Victory Medal
- Navy Occupation Service Medal (with Asia clasp)

== Sources ==
- United States. Dept. of the Treasury (1962). Treasury Decisions Under the Customs, Internal Revenue, Industrial Alcohol, Narcotic and Other Laws, Volume 97. U.S. Government Printing Office.
- Moore, Capt. John (1984). Jane's Fighting Ships 1984-85. Jane's Information Group. ISBN 978-0710607959.
- Saunders, Stephen (2009). Jane's Fighting Ships 2009-2010. Jane's Information Group. ISBN 978-0710628886.
- Fairplay International Shipping Journal Volume 222. United Kingdom: Fairplay Publishing Limited. 1967.
