= USS Targeteer =

1945 LSM(R)-501-class landing ship medium (rocket)

History

United States
- Ordered: 1945, as LSM-508
- Builder: Brown Shipbuilding Company
- Laid down: 31 March 1945, as LSM(R)–508
- Launched: 28 April 1945
- Commissioned: 25 June 1945
- Decommissioned: 5 February 1947
- Recommissioned: 7 April 1961
- Decommissioned: 13 December 1968
- Renamed: Gunnison River, 1 October 1955; Targeteer, 26 June 1960
- Reclassified: LSM(R)-508, (Medium Landing Ship Rocket), February 1945; YV-3, (Drone Aircraft Catapult Control Ship), 26 May 1960
- Stricken: 1 January 1969
- Motto: The World's Smallest Aircraft Carrier
- Fate: Sold for scrapping, 10 December 1969

General characteristics
- Class & type: LSM(R)-501-class landing ship medium
- Displacement: Pre-conversion : 758 long tons (770 t) light; 993 long tons (1,009 t) attack; 1,175 long tons (1,194 t) full; Post-conversion : 1,084 long tons (1,101 t)
- Length: 203 ft 3 in (61.95 m)
- Beam: 34 ft 6 in (10.52 m)
- Draft: Pre-conversion : 5 ft 4 in (1.63 m) light; 6 ft 9 in (2.06 m) attack; 7 ft 9 in (2.36 m) full; Post-conversion : 6 ft 8 in (2.03 m)
- Propulsion: 2 × General Motors, non-reversing with airflex clutch, Cleveland diesels, 1,440 bhp (1,074 kW) each at 720 rpm, 2 screws
- Speed: 12.6 knots (23.3 km/h; 14.5 mph)
- Range: 3,000 nmi (5,600 km) at 13 kn (24 km/h; 15 mph)
- Complement: 6 officers, 137 enlisted
- Armament: 1 × 5"/38 caliber gun; 2 × twin 40 mm AA guns; 4 × twin 20 mm AA guns; 4 × 4.2 in (110 mm) mortars; 20 × continuous loading 5 in (130 mm) Ship-to-Shore rocket launchers (reduced to 10 after conversion)
- Armor: 10-lb. STS on conning station, pilot-house, radio room, radar plot, and rocket control; 10-lb. ASPP around 40 and 20 mm gun mounts and directors

USS Targeteer was an LSM(R)-501-class landing ship medium (rocket) originally projected as LSM-508. The landing craft was reclassified as LSM(R)-508 in February 1945 and laid down on 31 March 1945 at Houston, TX, by the Brown Shipbuilding Corporation. Launched on 28 April 1945, LSM(R)-508 was commissioned at Houston on 25 June 1945.

== Service history ==
=== Landing ship medium (rocket), 1945–1947 ===
LSM(R)-508 departed Houston on 30 June and arrived at Galveston, TX, the same day to begin fitting out. She got underway again on 5 July and arrived at Charleston, SC, five days later, to receive her rocket launchers and undergo alterations. The landing ship shifted to Little Creek, VA, on 31 July. During her shakedown, conducted from 1 to 15 August 1945, Japan capitulated, ending the war in the Pacific.

LSM(R)-508 operated out of Little Creek, off the Virginia Capes, and in the Caribbean, conducting training there out of San Juan, Puerto Rico, and Guantanamo Bay, Cuba, into 1946. Returning to Little Creek on 24 March, the landing ship participated in further local training operations into the summer.

After shifting to Baltimore, MD, in July, for repairs, LSM(R)-508 sailed for Houston in October, transited the Panama Canal on 30 November, and arrived at San Diego, CA, soon thereafter, to prepare for inactivation. Decommissioned on 5 February 1947, LSM(R)-508 was placed in reserve at San Diego. She remained inactive for the next 22 years. During this time, she was named Gunnison River on 1 October 1955.

=== Drone aircraft catapult control ship, 1960–1969 ===
Apparently slated for disposal in late 1959, Gunnison River was reinstated on the Navy list early in 1960 and selected for conversion to a drone aircraft catapult control ship. Accordingly, reclassified to (YV-3) on 26 May 1960, Gunnison River was renamed Targeteer on 26 June 1960. Placed "in service" in March 1961, Targeteer was commissioned on 7 April 1961.

Homeported at San Diego, from 1961 to 1968, Targeteer operated under the operational control of Commander, Fleet Training Group, San Diego - receiving the necessary upkeep and repairs from Service Group 1. Her primary mission included the launch and recovery of radio controlled drone aircraft and surface drone unit targets, maintained by Utility Unit 3, furnishing simulated "enemy" aircraft and high-speed surface craft exercises. The surface craft ("Firefish", were based on the supposed PT boat attacks on USS Maddox (DD-731) and USS Turner Joy (DD-951) in the Tonkin Gulf. These surface craft were very fast radio-controlled boats. Dubbed "the world's smallest aircraft carrier," Targeteer provided these support services for the United States Pacific Fleet into 1968. Her morse-code callsign was "N-T-Q-O" and her communication guard was held by COMTRAPAC Communications (Commander Training Command, US Pacific Fleet), on the Fleet Anti-Submarine Warfare School (now CENTER), San Diego, (while in port) where Targeteer tied up.

Decommissioned on 31 December 1968, Targeteer was struck from the Navy list on 1 January 1969. The former drone aircraft catapult control craft was subsequently sold to the American Ship Dismantling Co., of Portland, OR, on 10 December 1969 and scrapped soon thereafter.

== Awards ==
USS Targeteer received:

- American Campaign Medal
- Asiatic-Pacific Campaign Medal
- World War II Victory Medal
- National Defense Service Medal
