= USS Elk River =

LSM(R)-501-class medium landing ship

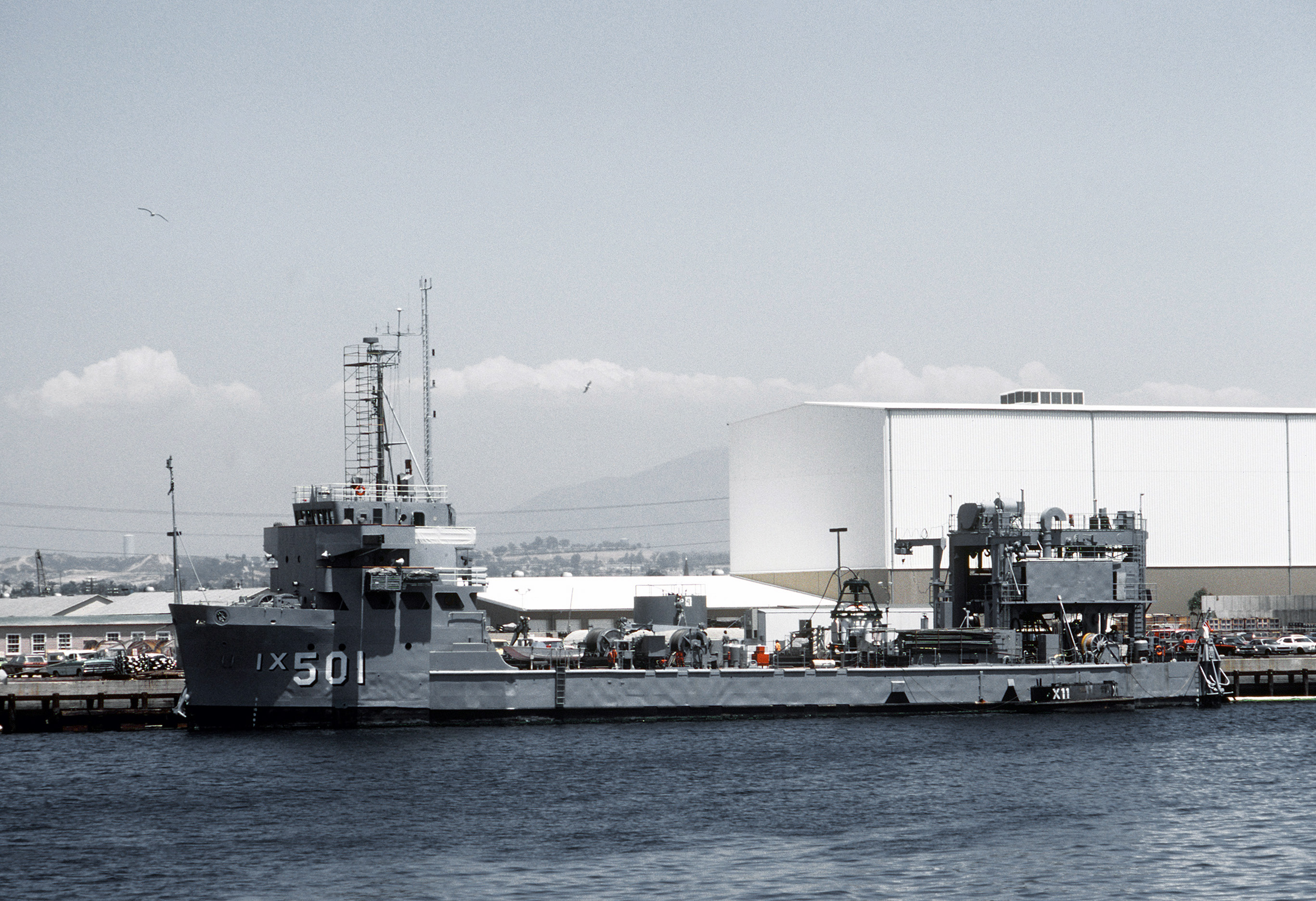
- USS Elk River in 1982

History

United States
- Name: LSM(R)-501
- Builder: Brown Shipbuilding Co.
- Laid down: 24 March 1945
- Launched: 21 April 1945
- Commissioned: 27 May 1945
- Decommissioned: 1 August 1946
- Reclassified: 1 October 1955
- Recommissioned: January 1969
- Decommissioned: October 1986
- Renamed: Elk River
- Namesake: Elk River
- Stricken: 13 August 1999
- Home port: San Diego
- Identification: Hull number: IX-501
- Motto: No Assignment We Shun, Till The Seas We've Won
- Honours and awards: See Awards
- Fate: Sunk as target, 24 February 2001

General characteristics
- Class & type: LSM(R)-501-class landing ship medium
- Displacement: 758 t (746 long tons), light; 993 t (977 long tons), attack; 1,175 t (1,156 long tons), full
- Length: 206 ft 3 in (62.87 m)
- Beam: 34 ft 6 in (10.52 m)
- Draft: 5 ft 4 in (1.63 m), light; 6 ft 9 in (2.06 m), attack; 7 ft 9 in (2.36 m), full
- Installed power: 2,800 shp (2,088 kW)
- Propulsion: 2 × GM 16-278A diesel engines; 2 × screws
- Speed: 13 knots (24 km/h; 15 mph)
- Range: 3,000 mi (4,800 km) at 13 kn (24 km/h; 15 mph)
- Complement: 6 officers, 137 enlisted
- Armament: 1 × single 5"/38 caliber gun; 2 × twin Bofors 40 mm guns; 4 × twin 20 mm AA guns; 4 × 4.2 in (110 mm) mortars; 10 × twin continuous loading 5-inch (130 mm) Ship-to-Shore rocket launchers

USS LSM(R)-501 was the lead ship of the LSM(R)-501-class landing ship medium built in 1945 for service in World War II. She was later converted into a test range support ship and renamed USS Elk River (IX-501). Her namesake was a Minnesota town named Elk River.

== Construction and career ==
LSM(R)-501 was laid down on 24 March 1945 at Houston, Texas, by the Brown Shipbuilding Company. She was launched on 21 April 1945 and commissioned on 27 May 1945.

LSM(R)-501 served in the Pacific before and after the Japanese Surrender in September 1945. This vessel was designed to carry both shorter range guns and rocket launchers to deliver large volumes of fire in short periods. Decommissioned on 1 August 1946 at Astoria, the vessel was laid up in the reserve fleet Columbia River Group.

Renamed and redesignated USS Elk River (IX-501) on 1 October 1955, she was converted into a test range support ship at Avondale Shipyards and at San Francisco Bay Naval Shipyard.

In November 1967, she was underway off Long Beach, California in support of the SEALAB III Project.

In early 1982, Elk River began her installation of the Mk.14 CCSDS until the summer of that year. Used as the Naval Saturation Diving School chamber 1982 - 1984. The ship later served as a barracks craft in October 1986.

Struck from the Naval Register in August 1999, Elk River was sunk as a target in February 2001.

A model of USS Elk River (LSM(R)-501, later IX-501) is on display in the Cold War Gallery, Building 70.

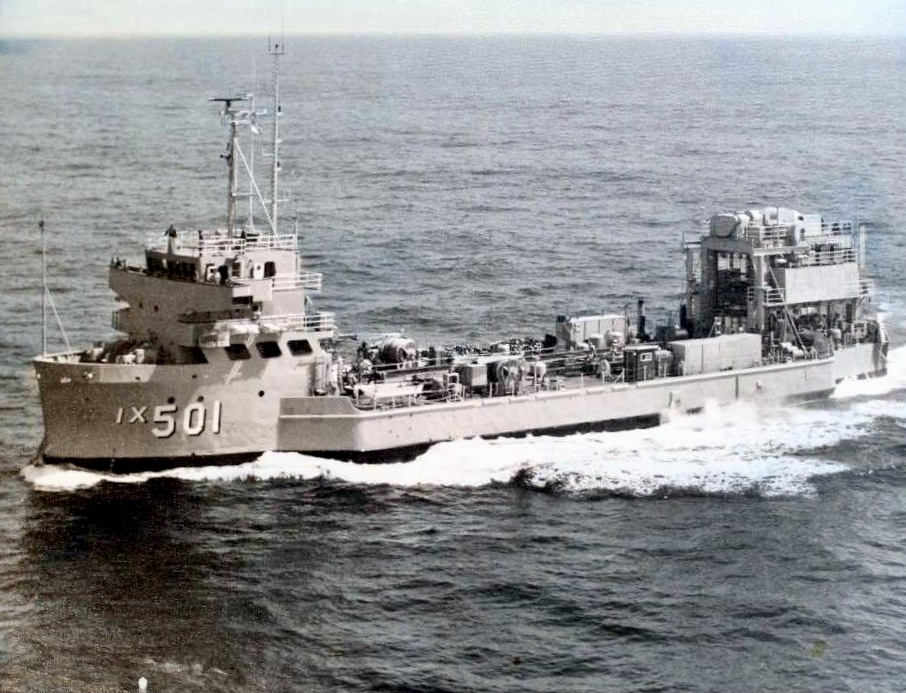
LSM(R)-501 after her conversion in 1955

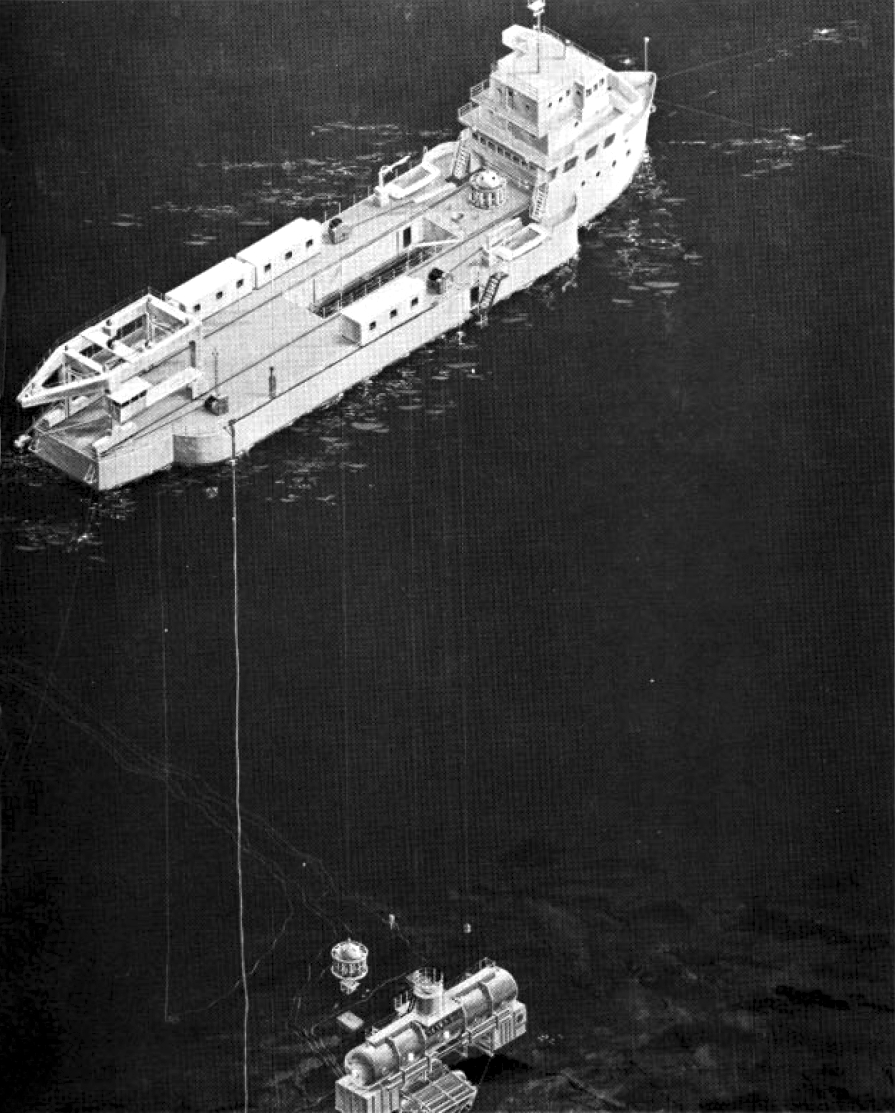
Elk River and SEALAB III drawing, 1968

== Awards ==
- Navy Meritorious Unit Commendation
- American Campaign Medal
- World War II Victory Medal
- National Defense Service Medal
