= USS LSM-216 =

1944 LSM-1-class landing ship medium

History

United States
- Name: USS LSM-216
- Builder: Dravo Corporation; Wilmington, Delaware
- Commissioned: 29 July 1944
- Decommissioned: 2 May 1946
- Honors and awards: 1 battle star, World War II
- Fate: Sold to the Dominican Republic, November 1946

History

Dominican Republic
- Name: San Rafael (BA-103)
- Acquired: November 1946
- Out of service: 1960

General characteristics
- Class & type: LSM-1-class landing ship medium
- Displacement: 520 t.(light); 743 t. (landing); 1,095 t.(fully loaded)
- Length: 203 ft 6 in (62.03 m)
- Beam: 34 ft 6 in (10.52 m)
- Draft: 3 ft 6 in (1.07 m) fwd, 7 ft 8 in (2.34 m) aft; fully loaded, 6 feet 4 inches (1.93 m) fwd, 8 feet 3 inches (2.51 m) aft
- Propulsion: Two Fairbanks Morse (model 38D81/8X10, reversible with hydraulic clutch) diesels. Direct drive with 1,440 BHP each @ 720rpm, twin screws
- Speed: 13.2 knots (24.4 km/h) (max.), (928 tons displ.)
- Endurance: 4,900 mi (7,900 km) @ 12 knots (22 km/h) (928 tons displacement)
- Capacity: 5 medium or 3 heavy tanks, or 6 LVT's, or 9 DUKW's
- Troops: 2 officers, 46 enlisted
- Complement: 5 officers, 54 enlisted
- Armament: 6 × 20 mm AA guns
- Armor: 10-lb. STS splinter shield to gun mounts, pilot house and conning station

USS LSM-216 was a LSM-1-class landing ship medium built for the U.S. Navy during World War II. Like many of her class, she was not named and is properly referred to by her hull designation.

LSM-216 was laid down by the Dravo Corporation of Wilmington, Delaware; launched on an unknown date; and commissioned on 29 July 1944.

During World War II LSM-216 was assigned to the Asiatic-Pacific theater and participated in the Assault and occupation of Iwo Jima in February 1945. In the film To the Shores of Iwo Jima, LSM-216 can be seen in action just off Yellow Beach on 19 February 1945.

Following the war, LSM-216 was decommissioned on 2 May 1946 at Calcasieu River, Lake Charles, Louisiana. She was struck from the Naval Register and sold in November 1946 to the navy of the Dominican Republic. She was renamed San Rafael (BA-103) and served in the Dominican Republic Navy until she was disposed of in 1960.

LSM-216 earned one battle star for World War II service.

== See also ==
- List of United States Navy LSMs
