= USS LSM-17 =

1944 LSM-1-class landing ship medium

History

United States
- Name: USS LSM-17
- Builder: Brown Shipbuilding Co., Houston, Texas
- Laid down: 10 April 1944
- Launched: 7 May 1944
- Commissioned: 14 June 1944
- Decommissioned: 22 July 1946
- Stricken: 15 November 1974
- Honors and awards: 1 battle star (Okinawa, 1945)
- Fate: Laid up, 1946; Loaned to France, 1 April 1954

France
- Acquired: On loan, 1 April 1954
- Fate: Returned to U.S. Navy, 14 October 1956; Loaned to South Korea, 18 October 1956

South Korea
- Acquired: On loan, 18 October 1956; Bought outright, 15 November 1974

General characteristics
- Class & type: LSM-1-class landing ship medium
- Displacement: 530 long tons (539 t) light; 900 long tons (914 t) fully loaded
- Length: 203 ft 6 in (62.03 m) o/a
- Beam: 34 ft (10 m)
- Draft: Landing : 3 ft 6 in (1.07 m) forward; 7 ft 8 in (2.34 m) aft; Full load : 6 ft 4 in (1.93 m) forward; 8 ft 3 in (2.51 m) aft
- Propulsion: Fairbanks-Morse diesel engines, 2,800 shp (2,088 kW), direct drive, 2 screws
- Speed: 13.3 knots (24.6 km/h; 15.3 mph)
- Range: 5,000 nmi (9,300 km) at 7 kn (13 km/h; 8.1 mph)
- Capacity: Either; 5 × medium tanks or; 3 × heavy tanks (150 tons max. payload, beaching) or; 6 × LVTs or; 9 × DUKWs
- Troops: 54 troops
- Complement: 4 officers, 54 enlisted
- Armament: 2 × 40 mm AA guns; 4 × 20 mm AA guns

The USS LSM-17 was a LSM-1-class landing ship medium of the United States Navy, commissioned at Brown Shipyards in Houston, Texas, on 14 June 1944. During the remainder of World War II, it served in the Pacific.
