= USS LSM-471 =

LSM-1-class landing ship medium

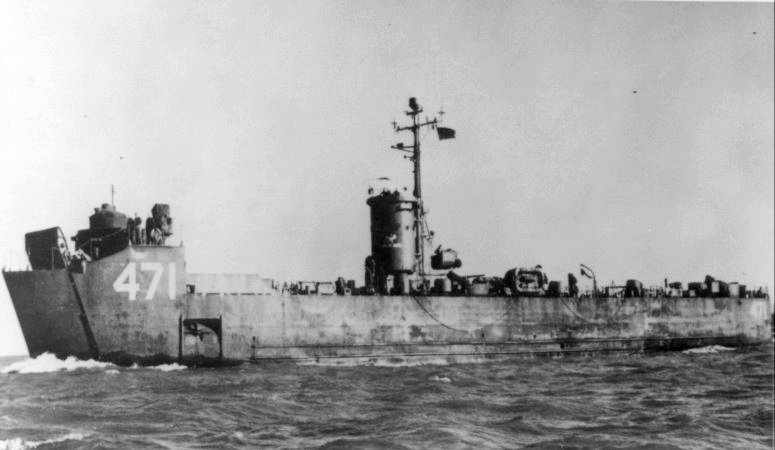
- USS LSM-471

History

United States
- Name: LSM-471
- Builder: Brown Shipbuilding Co., Houston
- Laid down: 27 January 1945
- Launched: 17 February 1945
- Commissioned: 23 March 1945
- Decommissioned: 13 May 1946
- Nickname(s): Can-Do Maru
- Honors and awards: See Awards
- Fate: Transferred to France, 7 May 1954

History

France
- Name: L9052
- Acquired: 7 May 1954
- Commissioned: 14 August 1954
- Decommissioned: 1956
- Fate: Return to US, 15 November 1956

History

Taiwan
- Name: Mei Ping; (美平)
- Acquired: 1956
- Commissioned: November 1956
- Decommissioned: June 2005
- Identification: Pennant number: LSM-353
- Fate: Unknown

General characteristics
- Class & type: LSM-1-class landing ship medium
- Displacement: 520 long tons (528 t) light; 743 long tons (755 t) landing; 1,095 long tons (1,113 t) full load
- Length: 203 ft 6 in (62.03 m) o/a
- Beam: 34 ft 6 in (10.52 m)
- Draft: 3 ft 6 in (1.07 m) forward; 7 ft 8 in (2.34 m) aft; Fully loaded : 6 ft 4 in (1.93 m) forward; 8 ft 3 in (2.51 m) aft
- Propulsion: 2 × Fairbanks-Morse (model 38D81/8X10, reversible with hydraulic clutch) diesels. Direct drive with 1,440 bhp (1,074 kW) each @ 720 rpm, twin screws
- Speed: 13.2 knots (15.2 mph; 24.4 km/h)
- Range: 4,900 nmi (9,100 km) at 12 kn (22 km/h)
- Capacity: 5 medium or 3 heavy tanks, or 6 LVTs, or 9 DUKWs
- Troops: 2 officers, 46 enlisted
- Complement: 5 officers, 54 enlisted
- Armament: 6 × 20 mm AA gun mounts
- Armor: 10-lb. STS splinter shield to gun mounts, pilot house and conning station

USS LSM-471 was a LSM-1-class landing ship medium in the United States Navy during World War II. The ship was transferred to France and renamed L9052, later transferred to Republic of China as ROCS Mei Ping (LSM-353).

== Construction and career ==
LSM-471 was laid down on 27 January 1945 at Brown Shipbuilding Co., Houston, Texas. Launched on 17 February 1945 and commissioned on 23 March 1945.

During World War II, LSM-471 was assigned to the Asiatic-Pacific theater. She was assigned to occupation service in the Far East from 28 September to 4 November 1945.

LSM-471 was decommissioned on 13 May 1946 in Astoria, Oregon.

She was struck from the Navy Register.

The ship was transferred to the France on 7 May 1954 and renamed L9052. She was put into service on 14 August 1954 until 1954, in which was returned to US custody on 15 November 1956, to be transferred to the Republic of China Navy in the same month.

Taiwan refitted the ship with a new bridge between 1969 and 1973 and redesignated LSM-659 between 1978 and 1979.

The ship was renamed ROCS Mei Ping (LSM-353) and served from November 1956 until June 2005.

== Awards ==
LST-471 have earned the following awards:

- American Campaign Medal
- Asiatic-Pacific Campaign Medal
- Navy Occupation Service Medal (with Asia clasp)
- World War II Victory Medal
- Philippine Liberation Medal

== Sources ==
- United States. Dept. of the Treasury (1962). Treasury Decisions Under the Customs, Internal Revenue, Industrial Alcohol, Narcotic and Other Laws, Volume 97. U.S. Government Printing Office.
- Moore, Capt. John (1984). Jane's Fighting Ships 1984-85. Jane's Information Group. ISBN 978-0710607959.
- Saunders, Stephen (2009). Jane's Fighting Ships 2009-2010. Jane's Information Group. ISBN 978-0710628886.
- Fairplay International Shipping Journal Volume 222. United Kingdom: Fairplay Publishing Limited. 1967.
