= USS LSM-135 =

1944 LSM-1-class landing ship medium

History

United States
- Name: USS LSM-135
- Builder: Charleston Navy Yard
- Laid down: 13 March 1944
- Launched: 23 April 1944
- Commissioned: 31 May 1944
- Honors and awards: 3 battle stars (World War II)
- Fate: Sunk by kamikaze attack off Okinawa, 25 May 1945

General characteristics
- Class & type: LSM-1-class landing ship medium
- Displacement: 520 long tons (528 t) light; 743 long tons (755 t) landing; 1,095 long tons (1,113 t) full
- Length: 203 ft 6 in (62.03 m) o/a
- Beam: 34 ft 6 in (10.52 m)
- Draft: Light : 3 ft 6 in (1.07 m) forward; 7 ft 8 in (2.34 m) aft; Full load : 6 ft 4 in (1.93 m) forward; 8 ft 3 in (2.51 m) aft
- Propulsion: 2 × Fairbanks Morse (model 38D81/8X10, reversible with hydraulic clutch) diesels. Direct drive with 1,440 bhp (1,070 kW) each at 720 rpm, twin screws
- Speed: 13.2 knots (24.4 km/h; 15.2 mph) (928 tons displacement)
- Range: 4,900 nmi (9,100 km) at 12 kn (22 km/h; 14 mph) (928 tons displacement)
- Capacity: 5 medium or 3 heavy tanks, or 6 LVT's, or 9 DUKW's
- Troops: 2 officers, 46 enlisted
- Complement: 5 officers, 54 enlisted
- Armament: 6 × single 20 mm AA gun mounts
- Armor: 10-lb. STS splinter shield to gun mounts, pilot house and conning station

USS LSM-135 was a LSM-1-class landing ship medium built for the United States Navy during World War II. Like many of her class, she was not named and is properly referred to by her hull designation.

She was laid down on 13 March 1944, at the Charleston Navy Yard, launched on 23 April 1944, and commissioned as USS LSM-135 on 31 May 1944.

== Service history ==
=== Philippines ===
LSM-135 was assigned to the Asiatic-Pacific Theater and participated in the Leyte operation, which included Leyte landings, 20 October 1944, and Ormoc Bay landings, 7 to 8 December 1944. She also participated in additional Philippine landings at Luzon and at Lingayen Gulf on 9 January 1945.

=== Okinawa, kamikaze strike ===
LSM-135 participated in the Assault and occupation of Okinawa Gunto in April and May 1945. While operating at Okinawa she was sunk by kamikaze attack off the Ryukyu Islands, 25 May 1945 at approximately 0830 hours. LSM-135 had only been in service 11 months and 25 days. At the time of her sinking LSM-135 was picking up survivors from the minesweeper Spectacle (AM-305) when it also was hit by kamikaze attack and burst into flames. The destroyer escort Fleming (DE-32) rescued twenty survivors of the high speed transport Bates (APD-47), which was sinking from two kamikaze hits, and eleven survivors from LSM-135.

LSM-135 was struck from the Naval Register (date unknown).

Final Disposition, hulk donated, 10 July 1957, to the Government of the Ryukyu Islands, fate unknown.

LSM-135 earned three battle stars for World War II service

== See also ==
- Landing craft
- Battle of Okinawa
- Battle of Leyte
