= USS Mender =

1945 Gypsy-class salvage lifting vessel

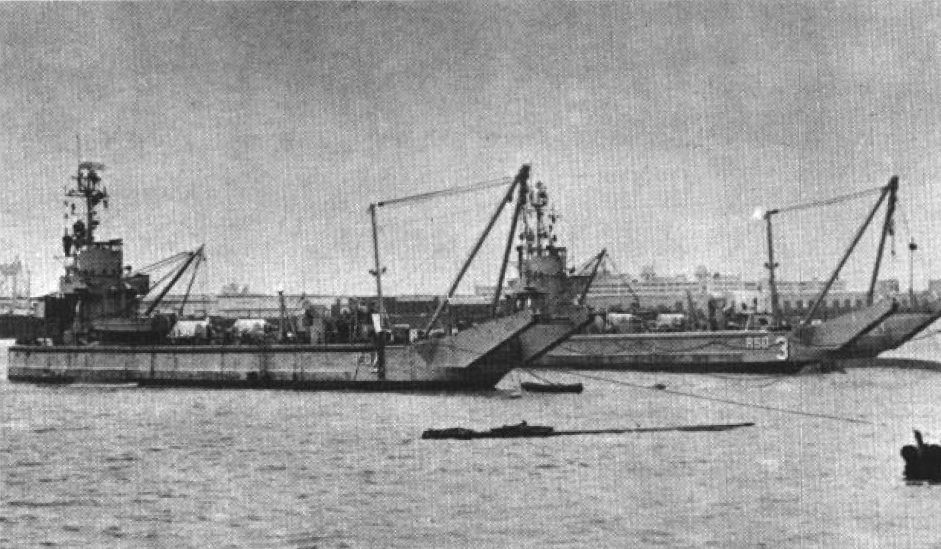
- Mender and Salvager at New Orleans, 1965

History

United States
- Name: USS Mender
- Ordered: 1945, as LSM-550
- Builder: Brown Shipbuilding, Houston, Texas
- Laid down: 25 August 1945
- Launched: 7 December 1945
- Commissioned: 8 March 1946
- Decommissioned: 21 January 1948
- Renamed: USS Mender, 1 May 1945
- Reclassified: ARS(D)-2 (Salvage Lifting Vessel), 24 April 1945
- Recommissioned: 12 September 1951
- Decommissioned: 20 December 1955
- Stricken: 1 June 1973
- Fate: Sold for scrapping, 1 January 1974

General characteristics
- Class & type: Gypsy-class salvage lifting vessel
- Displacement: 816 long tons (829 t)
- Length: 224 ft 9 in (68.50 m)
- Beam: 34 ft 10 in (10.62 m)
- Draft: 8 ft 4 in (2.54 m)
- Propulsion: 2 × Fairbanks-Morse (model 38D81/8X10, reversible with hydraulic clutch) diesel engines, direct drive with 1,440 bhp (1,074 kW) each at 720 rpm, twin screws
- Speed: 13 knots (24 km/h; 15 mph)
- Range: 4,900 nmi (9,100 km) at 12 kn (22 km/h; 14 mph) (928 tons displacement)
- Complement: 65 officers and enlisted
- Armament: 2 × 20 mm AA guns

USS Mender (ARS(D)-2) was a Gypsy-class salvage lifting vessel of the United States Navy. Originally designated LSM‑550, she was reclassified (ARS(D)‑2) on 24 April 1945, and was laid down on 25 August 1945 by Brown Shipbuilding Corporation, Houston, Texas. Launched on 7 December 1945; and commissioned on 8 March 1946.

== Service history ==
=== 1946–1948 ===
Designed for salvage work, specifically emergency harbor clearance, Mender completed her shakedown training in the Norfolk, VA, area and got underway, 30 April 1946, for the Pacific. Arriving at Pearl Harbor on 23 June she reported to CINCPAC and was assigned to Joint Task Force 1 for "Operation Crossroads". Sailing from Pearl Harbor on 27 June, she arrived at Bikini Atoll on 9 July and began anchorage operations. Moving out of the harbor on 24 July, she witnessed the experimental explosion of the atomic bomb the following morning from area "Mercury", 15 miles away. Within three hours of the detonation she returned to the harbor to assist in recovering beached and damaged craft and in gathering scientific information on underwater effects of the blast.

Departing the atoll on 4 September, she operated in the Hawaiian area until December when she sailed for overhaul at San Pedro, CA. On 17 July 1947 she left Long Beach, CA for another mid‑Pacific deployment, and for the remainder of the year cleared beaches and harbors at Kwajalein, Guam, and Angaur of wrecked pontoons, targets, and sunken hulks. Included in the latter were landing craft, tugs, barges, and the bow of the Pittsburgh (CA-72), which she helped raise and tow out to sea for sinking.

Returning to Pearl Harbor on 1 January 1948, she sailed on the 5th for San Diego, CA. There she reported to the Pacific Reserve Fleet on 17 January and decommissioned on the 21st.

=== 1951–1955 ===
She remained out of commission in reserve until recommissioned on 12 September 1951. On 19 November she got underway for her home port, Pearl Harbor, arriving on the 29th. She departed Hawaiian waters 2 February and sailed to Eniwetok where she replaced moorings before continuing on to Japan, arriving at Sasebo on 14 March.

On 12 April she headed for the Korean combat zone to salvage SS Park Benjamin, grounded with several compartments flooded near Pusan. In May she salvaged LST‑578 off Cheju-do. During the next three months, she cruised the Korean coast to clear anchorages, conduct surveys, and plant buoys and moorings. Then on 2 September she pointed her bow south for the Philippines and for the next month and a half conducted diving and demolition operations to rid Subic Bay of the hulk of the Japanese vessel Oroyoku Maru.

Arriving back at Pearl Harbor on 17 December Mender operated in the mid‑Pacific area until sailing for Japan on 20 August 1953. Dropping anchor at Sasebo on 11 September, she sailed again for Inchon on the 23rd. There, until mid-January 1954, she carried out a harbor clearance project. After a similar assignment near Paengyong Do in February, she began preparations for her second atomic test, "Operation Castle". Arriving at Bikini on 24 March, she fulfilled much the same role as on her first such assignment until 11 May, then sailed via Johnston Island, to Pearl Harbor. Arriving 23 May, Mender did various salvage jobs in the Hawaiians until 10 October 1955, when she got underway for Astoria, OR. Here she decommissioned and joined the Columbia River group of the Pacific Reserve Fleet on 20 December 1955.

Later transferred to San Diego, she remained in reserve until struck from the Naval Register, 1 June 1973. She was sold for scrapping by the Defense Reutilization and Marketing Service (DRMS), 1 January 1974.

== Awards ==
USS Mender received:
Two battle stars for the Korean War.
World War II Victory Medal
National Defense Service Medal
Korean Service Medal (×2)
United Nations Service Medal
Republic of Korea War Service Medal (retroactive)
