= USS LSM-217 =

1944 LSM-1-class landing ship medium

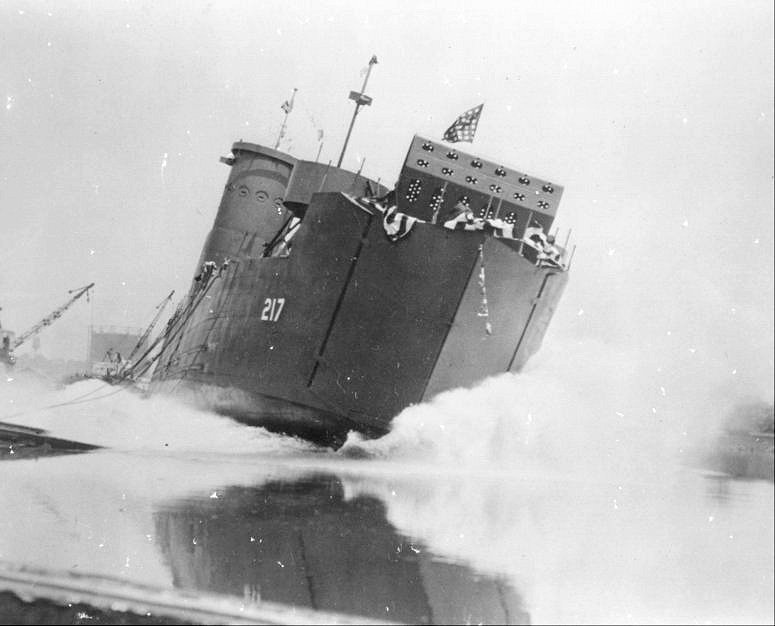
- LSM-217 Launching at Dravo Shipbuilding Co, Wilmington Delaware

History

United States
- Name: USS LSM-217
- Builder: Dravo Corporation
- Commissioned: 4 Aug 1944
- Honors and awards: 1 battle stars (World War II)
- Fate: Sold, 22 October 1947, to Avondale Marine Ways, Inc., Westwego, LA., Fate Unknown

General characteristics
- Class & type: LSM-1-class landing ship medium
- Displacement: 520 long tons (528 t) light; 743 long tons (755 t) landing; 1,095 long tons (1,113 t) full
- Length: 203 ft 6 in (62.03 m) o/a
- Beam: 34 ft 6 in (10.52 m)
- Draft: Light : 3 ft 6 in (1.07 m) forward; 7 ft 8 in (2.34 m) aft; Full load : 6 ft 4 in (1.93 m) forward; 8 ft 3 in (2.51 m) aft
- Propulsion: 2 × Fairbanks Morse (model 38D81/8X10, reversible with hydraulic clutch) diesels. Direct drive with 1,440 bhp (1,070 kW) each at 720 rpm, twin screws
- Speed: 13.2 knots (24.4 km/h; 15.2 mph) (928 tons displacement)
- Range: 4,900 nmi (9,100 km) at 12 kn (22 km/h; 14 mph) (928 tons displacement)
- Capacity: 5 medium or 3 heavy tanks, or 6 LVT's, or 9 DUKW's
- Troops: 2 officers, 46 enlisted
- Complement: 5 officers, 54 enlisted
- Armament: 6 × single 20 mm AA gun mounts
- Armor: 10-lb. STS splinter shield to gun mounts, pilot house and conning station

USS LSM-217 was a LSM-1-class landing ship medium built for the United States Navy during World War II. Like many of her class, she was not named and is properly referred to by her hull designation.

She was laid down (Unknown) at Dravo Corporation, Wilmington, DE., launched on (Unknown), and commissioned as USS LSM-217 on 4 Aug 1944.

== Service history ==
LSM-217 was assigned to the Asiatic-Pacific Theater and crossed the International Date Line on 7 November 1944. As part of the Invasion of Lingayen Gulf she participated in the Luzon operation, which included the Lingayen Gulf landings (4-12 January 1945).

LSM-217 was struck from the Naval Register in 1946.

Final Disposition, sold, 22 October 1947, to Avondale Marine Ways, Inc., Westwego, LA., fate unknown.

LSM-217 earned one battle stars for World War II service

== See also ==
- Landing Ship Medium
- World War II
- Landing craft
- Battle of Leyte
