= Landing Ship Medium =

American amphibious assault ship type

A Landing Ship Medium (LSM) was originally an amphibious assault ship of the United States Navy in World War II. Of a size between that of Landing Ships Tank and Landing Craft Infantry, 558 LSMs were built for the USN between 1944 and 1945. Most of the vessels built on this frame were regular transports, but several dozen were converted during construction to specialized roles. Most LSMs were scrapped during the Cold War, but several were sold by the United States Department of Defense to foreign nations or private shipping companies.

OPNAV N95 established a new LSM program in 2020. The new LSM will be 350 to 400 feet (110 to 120 m) long, able to operate at 22 knots and have a range of 6,500 miles (10,500 km). The cost will be much lower than traditional amphibious shipping, according to a story in the March 2023 Marine Corps Gazette. The piece suggests that a MLR (Marine Littoral Regiment) would need nine LSMs. The lead ship of the new class is LSM-1 USS McClung.

== LSM-1-class Landing Ship Medium (Transport) ==
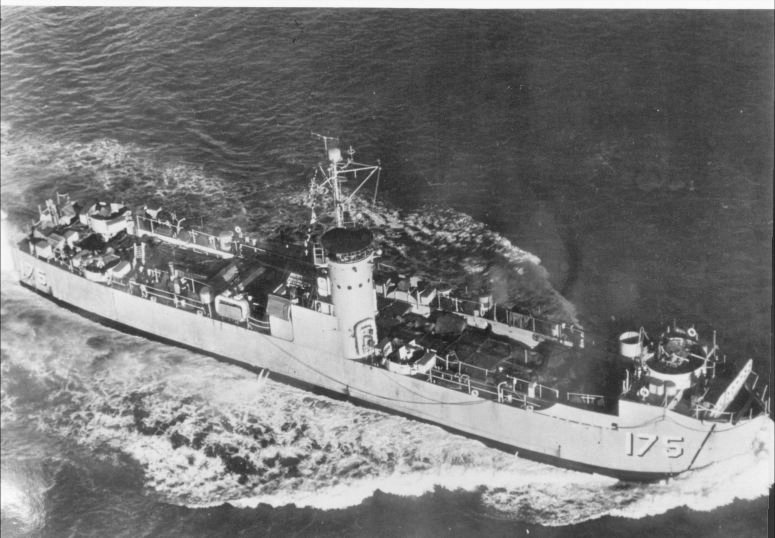
- USS LSM-175 underway off Charleston Navy Yard in 1944

General characteristics
- Class & type: LSM-1 class Landing Ship Medium
- Displacement: 530 long tons (539 t) empty; 900 long tons (914 t) loaded
- Length: 203 ft 6 in (62.03 m)
- Beam: 34 ft (10 m)
- Draft: Landing : 3 ft 6 in (1.07 m) forward; 7 ft 8 in (2.34 m) aft; Full load : 6 ft 4 in (1.93 m) forward; 8 ft 3 in (2.51 m) aft
- Propulsion: Fairbanks-Morse or GM Cleveland diesel engines, 2,800 shp (2,088 kW), direct drive, 2 screws
- Speed: 13.3 knots (24.6 km/h; 15.3 mph)
- Range: 5,000 nmi (9,300 km) at 7 kn (13 km/h; 8.1 mph)
- Capacity: 5 × medium tanks or; 3 × heavy tanks (150 tons max. payload, beaching) or; 6 × LVTs or; 9 × DUKWs
- Troops: 54 troops
- Complement: 4 officers, 54 enlisted
- Armament: Up to 2 × 40 mm AA guns; 4-6 × 20 mm AA guns (typically 4 if Bofors shipped)

=== List of LSM-1-class ships ===
In total, 558 LSM ships were launched. Some notable examples include:

| Name | Year launched | Fate | Short summary |
|---|---|---|---|
| USS LSM-17 | 7 May 1944 | Sold on 15 November 1974 | The USS LSM-17 was a LSM-1-class landing ship medium of the United States Navy, commissioned at Brown Shipyards in Houston, Texas, on 14 June 1944. During the remainder of World War II, it served in the Pacific. |
| USS LSM-19 | 14 May 1944 | Unknown | USS LSM-19 was a LSM-1-class landing ship medium in the United States Navy during World War II. She was later sold to South Korean Navy as ROKS Girin (LSM-610). |
| USS LSM-20 | 14 May 1944 | Sank on 5 December 1944 | USS LSM-20 was a LSM-1-class landing ship medium of the United States Navy, commissioned at Brown Shipyards in Houston, Texas, on 16 June 1944. During WWII, she operated in the Pacific. On 5 December 1944, the vessel sunk after she was hit by a Japanese kamikaze in the Surigao Strait in the Philippines. Five sailors were killed and another nine were wounded. |
| USS LSM-45 | 30 June 1944 | Scrapped after 1998 | USS LSM-45 was a LSM-1-class medium landing ship built for the United States Navy during World War II. The ship also served as Ypoploiarchos Grigoropoulos (L161) in the Hellenic Navy from 1958 to 1993. She was the last known surviving LSM in its original configuration. Her last location before scrapping was Marine Corps Base Camp Lejeune in North Carolina. LSM-45 was donated to the Museum of the Marine by the now defunct Amphibious Ship Museum under the understanding that it would be put on display at the museum, and was towed to North Carolina in 2004 from Omaha, Nebraska. The museum decided in 2007 that the ship would not be a part of the museum and tried looking for another home for the ship. In 2009, there were reports that the Museum was considering scrapping or sinking the ship as an artificial reef, and she was scrapped sometime between 2010 and 2014. |
| USS LSM-46 | 30 June 1944 | Sold on 23 October 1948 | USS LSM-46 was a LSM-1-class landing ship medium in the United States Navy during World War II. |
| USS LSM-56 | 21 July 1944 | Sold on 23 October 1948 | USS LSM-56 was a LSM-1-class landing ship medium in the United States Navy during World War II. |
| USS LSM-60 | 29 July 1944 | Scuttled on July 25, 1946 | USS LSM-60 was a World War II era landing ship, medium (LSM) amphibious assault ship of the United States Navy. It was notable for being used as the float to suspend a fission bomb underwater during the Operation Crossroads BAKER test, becoming the first naval vessel to deploy a nuclear weapon. |
| USS LSM-105 | 21 October 1944 | Sold on 10 December 1958 | USS LSM-105 was a LSM-1-class landing ship medium of the United States Navy, commissioned at Brown Shipyards in Houston, Texas, on 15 November 1944. During the remainder of World War II, it served in the Pacific. |
| USS LSM-110 | 28 October 1944 | Scrapped on 9 June 1976 | USS LSM-110 was a LSM-1-class landing ship medium in the United States Navy during World War II. The ship was transferred to France as L9012, South Vietnam as RVNS Hàn Giang (HQ-401) and Philippines to be cannibalized for spare parts. |
| USS LSM-115 | 11 November 1944 | Sold on 29 December 1946 | USS LSM-115 was a LSM-1-class Landing Ship Medium of the United States Navy that saw active service in World War II in the Pacific Theater. Built by the Brown Ship Building Co., Houston, Texas, the ship was commissioned on 2 December 1944. |
| USS LSM-125 | 25 November 1944 | Scrapped on 4 October 1977 | USS LSM-125 was a LSM-1-class landing ship medium in the United States Navy during World War II. The ship was transferred to France as L9013 and Japan as JDS LSM-3001. |
| USS LSM-135 | 23 April 1944 | Sank on 25 May 1945 | USS LSM-135 was a LSM-1-class landing ship medium built for the United States Navy during World War II. Like many of her class, she was not named and is properly referred to by her hull designation. She was laid down on 13 March 1944, at the Charleston Navy Yard, launched on 23 April 1944, and commissioned as USS LSM-135 on 31 May 1944. |
| USS LSM-149 | 27 May 1944 | Grounded on 5 December 1944 | USS LSM-149 was a LSM-1-class landing ship medium built for the U.S. Navy in World War II. Like most ships of her class, she was not named and known only by her designation. LSM-149 was laid down at the Charleston Navy Yard on 4 May 1944, and was launched 27 May 1944. She was commissioned along with sister ship USS LSM-148 on 8 July 1944 by Rear Admiral Jules James. Assigned to the Pacific Theatre, LSM-149 was damaged and breached while attempting to recover a barge in heavy surf off Sansapor, New Guinea on 30–31 July 1944. LSM-149 was grounded off the Philippines on 5 December 1944. (According to the United States Navy this happened on 14 December 1944, but her fate has also been reported as on 5 December 1944.) She was declared a total loss, and decommissioned on 15 April 1945. |
| USS LSM-157 | —N/a | Sank in September 1958 | Transferred to Nationalist China in 1949, recommissioned as Mei Le, sunk by Red Chinese artillery 9/1958 |
| USS Kodiak (LSM-161) | 27 June 1944 | Scrapped on 14 August 1972 | USS LSM-161 was a LSM-1-class landing ship medium built for the United States Navy during World War II. Like many of her class, she was not named and was properly referred to by her hull designation for much of her service life. LSM-161 was laid down on 3 June 1944 by Charleston Navy Yard; launched on 27 June 1944; and commissioned on 16 August 1944. |
| USS Oceanside (LSM-175) | 3 August 1944 | Scrapped in 1989 | |
| USS LSM-216 | —N/a | Scrapped in 1960 | USS LSM-216 was a LSM-1-class landing ship medium built for the U.S. Navy during World War II. Like many of her class, she was not named and is properly referred to by her hull designation. LSM-216 was laid down by the Dravo Corporation of Wilmington, Delaware; launched on an unknown date; and commissioned on 29 July 1944. During World War II LSM-216 was assigned to the Asiatic-Pacific theater and participated in the Assault and occupation of Iwo Jima in February 1945. In the film To the Shores of Iwo Jima, LSM-216 can be seen in action just off Yellow Beach on 19 February 1945. Following the war, LSM-216 was decommissioned on 2 May 1946 at Calcasieu River, Lake Charles, Louisiana. She was struck from the Naval Register and sold in November 1946 to the navy of the Dominican Republic. She was renamed San Rafael (BA-103) and served in the Dominican Republic Navy until she was disposed of in 1960. LSM-216 earned one battle star for World War II service. |
| USS LSM-217 | —N/a | Unknown | |
| USS LSM-236 | 4 July 1944 | Scrapped in 1972 | |
| USS LSM-247 | —N/a | Sold in February 1947 | |
| USS LSM-256 | —N/a | Sank on 16 June 1969 | Transferred to Nationalist China in 1949, recommissioned as Mei Hua, sunk in a collision with M.V. Ta Tung 16/6/69 |
| USS LSM-275 | 11 September 1944 | Scrapped in 1976 | Later renamed and reclassified USS Portunus (ARC-1) |
| USS LSM-297 | 30 October 1944 | Scrapped in 1958 | |
| USS LSM-315 | —N/a | Unknown | |
| USS LSM-319 | —N/a | Sank in 1971 | |
| USS LSM-333 | 13 October 1944 | Scuttled on 17 September 2006 | |
| USS LSM-335 | —N/a | —N/a | Later USNS LSM-335 (T-AG-335) Assigned Ryukyuan shuttle. |
| USS LSM-338 | 5 December 1944 | Scrapped | |
| USS LSM-355 | 2 December 1944 | Unknown | |
| USS LSM-380 | 13 January 1945 | Waiting for preservation | |
| USS LSM-397 | 6 January 1945 | Sold in November 1958 | |
| USS Hunting (LSM-398) | 6 January 1945 | Scrapped after 1983 | Later reclassified (E-AG-398) |
| USS LSM-462 | 3 February 1945 | Unknown | |
| USS LSM-469 | 17 February 1945 | Scuttled on 1 February 2003 | |
| USS LSM-471 | 17 February 1945 | Unknown | |
| USS LSM-477 | —N/a | Sank in 1971 | |
| USS LSM-478 | 3 March 1945 | Unknown | |
| USS Raritan (LSM-540) | 1 August 1945 | Unknown | |
| USS LSM-547 | —N/a | Abandoned by 1972 | |

== LSM(R)-188-class Landing Ship Medium (Rocket) ==
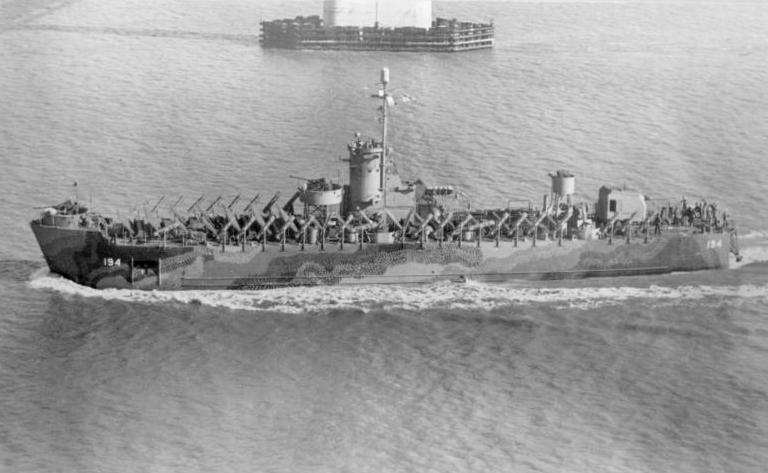
- USS LSM(R)-194 passing under the Cooper River Bridge, Charleston, SC, 2 December 1944

General characteristics
- Class & type: LSM(R)-188-class Landing Ship Medium (Rocket)
- Displacement: LSM(R)-188 to LSM(R)-195 : 968 long tons (984 t) loaded; LSM(R)-196 to LSM(R)-199 : 1,008 long tons (1,024 t) loaded
- Length: 203 ft 6 in (62.03 m)
- Beam: 34 ft (10 m)
- Draft: 5 ft 6 in (1.68 m) forward; 5 ft 9 in (1.75 m) aft
- Propulsion: GM Cleveland diesel engines, 2,800 shp (2,088 kW), direct drive, two screws
- Speed: 13.2 knots (24.4 km/h; 15.2 mph)
- Range: 5,000 nmi (9,300 km) at 7 kn (13 km/h; 8.1 mph)
- Complement: 5 officers, 76 enlisted
- Armament: LSM(R)-188 to LSM(R)-195 : 1 × 5"/38 caliber gun; 2 × 40 mm AA guns; 3 × 20 mm AA guns; 85 × Mk. 51 automatic rocket launchers; LSM(R)-196 to LSM(R)-199 : 1 × 5"/38 caliber gun; 2 × 40 mm AA guns; 75 × 4-rail Mk. 36 rocket launchers; 30 × 6-rail Mk. 30 rocket launchers; 85 × Mk. 51 automatic rocket launchers

| Name | Year launched | Fate | Short summary |
|---|---|---|---|
| USS LSM(R)-188 | 12 September 1944 | Sold for scrapping, 17 February 1948 | USS LSM(R)-188 was the lead ship of her class of twelve Landing Ship Medium (Rocket) of the United States Navy during World War II. The ship took part in the Battle of Okinawa. |
| USS LSM(R)-189 | 12 September 1944 | Sold for scrap, 17 February 1948 | USS LSM(R)-189 was a LSM(R)-188 class Landing Ship Medium (rocket) of the United States Navy during World War II. She was commanded by Lieutenant James Malcolm Stewart, USNR during the Battle of Okinawa. |
| USS LSM(R)-190 | 21 September 1944 | Sunk by Japanese Kamikaze plane off Okinawa, 4 May 1945 | USS LSM(R)-190 was a United States Navy LSM(R)-188-class Landing Ship Medium (Rocket). She was built at Charleston Navy Yard, Charleston, South Carolina and was commissioned on 21 November 1944. LSM(R)-190 took part in the Battle of Okinawa from 7 April–4 May 1945. She was hit and sunk by a Japanese suicide plane on 4 May 1945 while on the radar picket line. She later received a Navy Unit Commendation for her service off Okinawa. |
| USS LSM(R)-191 | | | LSM(R)-191 was a World War II LSM(R)-188-class Landing Ship Medium (Rocket) fitted for firing a rocket barrage. |
| USS LSM(R)-192 | | | LSM(R)-192 was a LSM(R)-188 class Landing Ship Medium (Rocket) of the US Navy during World War II. Laid down at Charleston Navy Yard, Charleston, South Carolina, the ship was commissioned on 21 November 1944. |
| USS LSM(R)-193 | | | LSM(R)-193 was an American Landing Ship Medium (Rocket) built in 1944, which provided naval gunfire and rocket support for US and Allied amphibious landings in World War II. It was laid down at Charleston Navy Yard and commissioned on 21 November 1944. It participated in the Battle of Okinawa as well as the run-up to the battle |
| USS LSM(R)-194 | | | USS LSM(R)-194 was a LSM(R)-188-class Landing Ship Medium (Rocket) of the United States Navy during World War II, which took part in the Battle of Okinawa. LSM(R)-194 was laid down at the Charleston Navy Yard, Charleston, South Carolina on 21 November 1944. It sank on 4 May 1945 when it was hit by a Japanese suicide plane while on radar picket duty. |
| USS LSM(R)-195 | | | LSM(R)-195 was laid down at Charleston Navy Yard. The ship was commissioned on 21 November 1944. |
| USS LSM(R)-196 | | | LSM(R)-196 was a US amphibious assault ship, laid down at Charleston Navy Yard. It was commissioned on 12 December 1944. |
| USS LSM(R)-197 | | | LSM(R)-197 was a United States Navy vessel laid down at Charleston Navy Yard, Charleston, South Carolina. The ship was commissioned on 8 December 1944. |
| USS LSM(R)-198 | | | USS LSM(R)-198 was a Landing Ship Medium (Rocket) of the US Navy during World War II. |
| USS LSM(R)-199 | | | LSM(R)-199 was a LSM(R)-188 class Landing Ship Medium (Rocket) of the US Navy during World War II. laid down at Charleston Navy Yard, Charleston, South Carolina, The ship was commissioned on 12 December 1944. |

== LSM(R)-401-class Landing Ship Medium (Rocket) ==
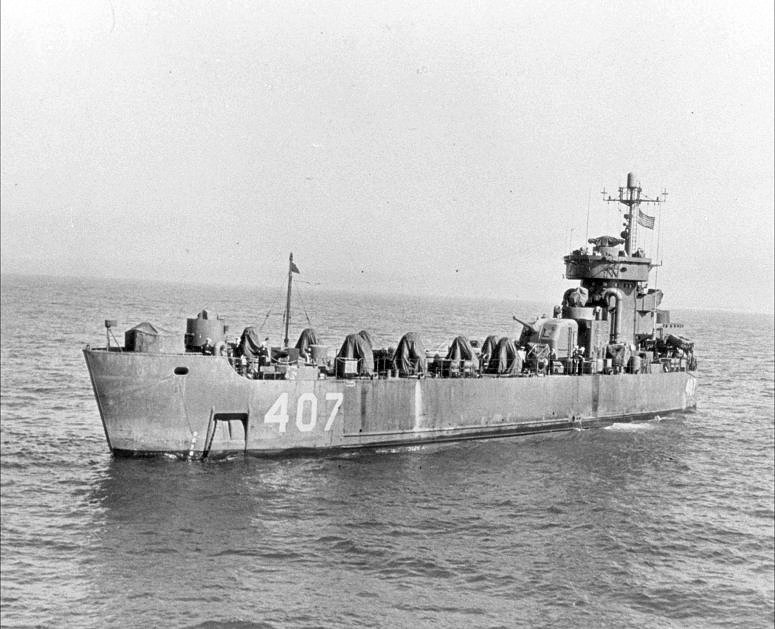
- USS LSM(R)-407, later renamed the USS Chariton River. Date and location unknown.

General characteristics
- Class & type: LSM-401(R)-class Landing Ship Medium (Rocket)
- Displacement: 1,175 long tons (1,194 t) loaded
- Length: 203 ft 6 in (62.03 m)
- Beam: 34 ft (10 m)
- Draft: 7 ft 9 in (2.36 m)
- Propulsion: GM Cleveland diesel engines, 2,800 shp (2,088 kW), direct drive, two screws
- Speed: 13 knots (24 km/h; 15 mph)
- Range: 5,000 nmi (9,300 km) at 7 kn (13 km/h; 8.1 mph)
- Complement: 6 officers, 137 enlisted
- Armament: 1 × 5"/38 caliber guns; 2 × 40 mm AA guns; 4 × 20 mm AA guns; 4 × 4.2 in (110 mm) mortars; 8-10 × continuous loading 5-inch (130 mm) Ship-to-Shore rocket launchers

- USS Big Black River (LSM(R)-401), later reclassified (LFR-401)
- USS Big Horn River (LSM(R)-402)
- USS Blackstone River (LSM(R)-403)
- USS Black Warrior River (LSM(R)-404), later reclassified (LFR-404)
- USS Broadkill River (LSM(R)-405), later reclassified (LFR-405)
- USS Canadian River (LSM(R)-406)
- USS Chariton River (LSM(R)-407)
- USS Charles River (LSM(R)-408)
- USS Clarion River (LSM(R)-409), later reclassified (LFR-409)
- USS Clark Fork River (LSM(R)-410)
- USS Cumberland River (LSM(R)-411)
- USS Desplaines River (LSM(R)-412), later reclassified (LFR-412)

== LSM(R)-501-class Landing Ship Medium (Rocket) ==
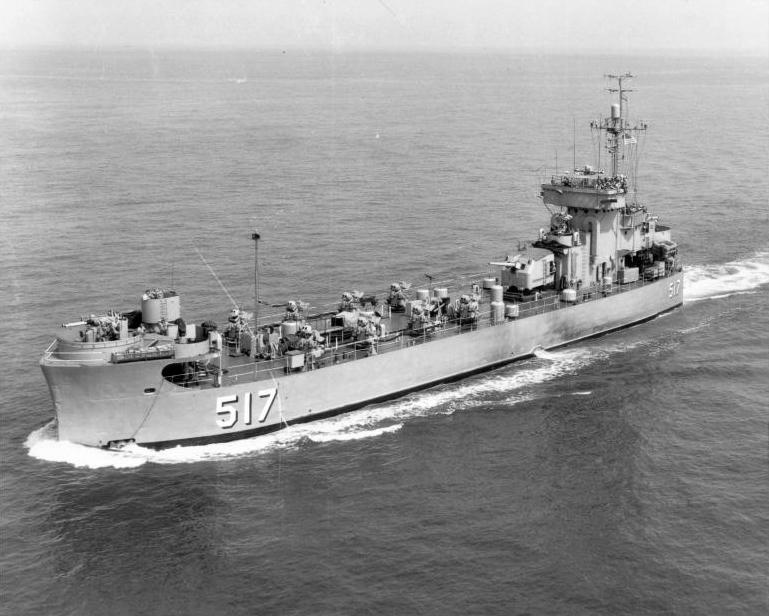
- USS Pee Dee River (LSM(R)-517) underway in 1954

General characteristics
- Class & type: LSM-501(R)-class Landing Ship Medium (Rocket)
- Displacement: 1,175 long tons (1,194 t) loaded
- Length: 203 ft 6 in (62.03 m)
- Beam: 34 ft 6 in (10.52 m)
- Draft: 7 ft 9 in (2.36 m)
- Propulsion: GM Cleveland diesel engines, 2,800 shp (2,088 kW), direct drive, two screws
- Speed: 13 knots (24 km/h; 15 mph)
- Range: 5,000 nmi (9,300 km) at 7 kn (13 km/h; 8.1 mph)
- Complement: 6 officers, 137 enlisted
- Armament: 1 × 5"/38 caliber gun; 4 × 40 mm AA guns; 8 × 20 mm AA guns; 4 × 4.2 in (110 mm) mortars; 20 × continuous loading 5-inch (130 mm) Ship-to-shore rocket launchers

- USS Elk River (LSM(R)-501), later reclassified (IX-501)
- USS Escalanteo River (LSM(R)-502)
- USS Flambeau River (LSM(R)-503)
- USS Gila River (LSM(R)-504)
- USS Grand River (LSM(R)-505)
- USS Green River (LSM(R)-506)
- USS Greenbrier River (LSM(R)-507)
- USS Gunnison River (LSM(R)-508), later reclassified and renamed USS Targeteer (YV-3)
- USS Holston River (LSM(R)-509)
- USS James River (LSM(R)-510)
- USS John Day River (LSM(R)-511)
- USS Lamiolle River (LSM(R)-512), later reclassified (LFR-512)
- USS Laramie River (LSM(R)-513), later reclassified (LFR-513)
- USS Maurice River (LSM(R)-514)
- USS Owyhee River (LSM(R)-515), later reclassified (LFR-515)
- USS Pearl River (LSM(R)-516)
- USS Pee Dee River (LSM(R)-517)
- USS Pit River (LSM(R)-518)
- USS Powder River (LSM(R)-519)
- USS Raccoon River (LSM(R)-520)
- USS Rainy River (LSM(R)-521)
- USS Red River (LSM(R)-522), later reclassified (LFR-522)
- USS Republican River (LSM(R)-523)
- USS Saint Croix River (LSM(R)-524)
- USS St. Francis River (LSM(R)-525), later reclassified (LFR-525)
- USS St. Johns River (LSM(R)-526)
- USS St. Joseph's River (LSM(R)-527)
- USS St. Mary's River (LSM(R)-528)
- USS St. Regis River (LSM(R)-529)
- USS Salmon Falls River (LSM(R)-530)
- USS Smoky Hill River (LSM(R)-531), later reclassified (LFR-531)
- USS Smyrna River (LSM(R)-532)
- USS Snake River (LSM(R)-533)
- USS Thames River (LSM(R)-534)
- USS Trinity River (LSM(R)-535)
- USS White River (LSM(R)-536), later reclassified (LFR-536)

== Gypsy-class salvage lifting vessels ==
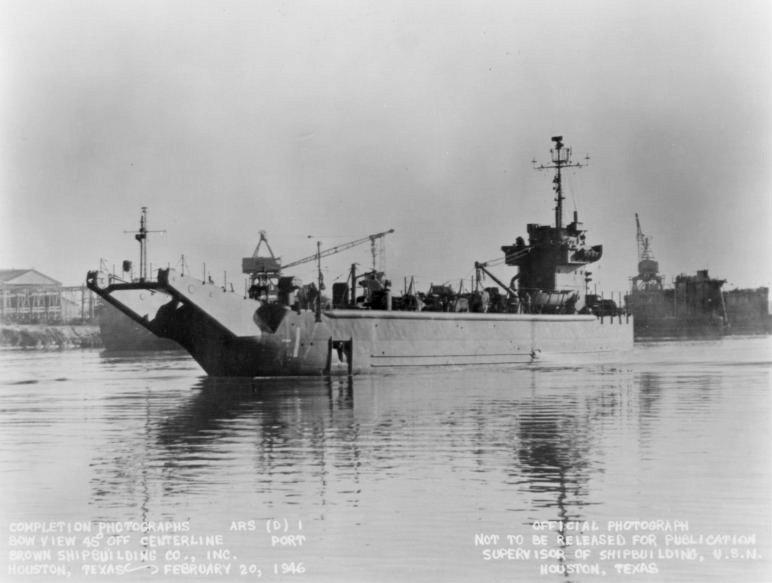
- USS Gypsy (ARS(D)-1) underway at Houston, Texas, in 1946

General characteristics
- Class & type: Gypsy-class salvage lifting vessels
- Displacement: 816 long tons (829 t)
- Length: 224 ft 9 in (68.50 m)
- Beam: 34 ft 10 in (10.62 m)
- Draft: 8 ft 4 in (2.54 m)
- Propulsion: Fairbanks-Morse diesel engines, 1,440 shp (1,074 kW), direct drive, two screws
- Speed: 13 knots (24 km/h; 15 mph)
- Range: 4,900 nmi (9,100 km) at 12 kn (22 km/h; 14 mph)
- Complement: 65 officers and enlisted
- Armament: 2 × 20 mm AA guns

- USS Gypsy (ARS(D)-1), authorized as LSM-549
- USS Mender (ARS(D)-2), authorized as LSM-550
- USS Salvager (ARS(D)-3), authorized as LSM-551, later reclassified to YMLC-3
- USS Windlass (ARS(D)-4), authorized as LSM-552, later reclassified to YMLC-4

== Production ==
Dates are launch dates.

- Brown Shipbuilding: Houston, TX: 254 (May 1944 - Apr 1946)
  - purpose-built yard for the war effort
- Charleston Navy Yard, North Charleston, SC: 121 (May 1944 - Nov 1945)
  - traditional military yard
- Dravo Corporation, Wilmington, DE: 65 (Apr 1944 - May 1945)
  - purpose-built yard for the war effort
- Pullman Company, Chicago, IL: 44 (May 1944 - May 1945)
  - traditional rail car manufacturer
- Federal Shipbuilding and Drydock Company, Newark, NJ: 42 (May 1944 - Feb 1945)
  - traditional civil and military yard
- Western Pipe and Steel, San Pedro, CA: 32 (Aug 1944 - Mar 1945)
  - traditional civil yard

Delivery:

- Q2 1944: 74
- Q3 1944: 129
- Q4 1944: 132
- Q1 1945: 111
- Q2 1945: 58
- Q3 1945: 30
- Q4 1945: 15
- 1946: 9

== Legacy ==
One LSM, USS LSM-45, survived in its original configuration until around 2010. It was in storage at Marine Station Camp Lejeune in Jacksonville, North Carolina. It was slated to become the centerpiece of the Museum of the Marine, but due to changed plans, was scrapped between 2010 and 2014.

== Mcclung Class ==
As of February 2023 the US Marine Corps has proposed the purchase of 18 to 35 modern LSMs; this LSM concept was previously known as the Light Amphibious Warship (LAW).

== See also ==
- List of United States Navy Landing Ship Mediums
- Landing Ship, Infantry
- Mark 8 Landing Craft Tank
