= USS Pee Dee River =

1945 LSM(R)-501-class landing ship medium

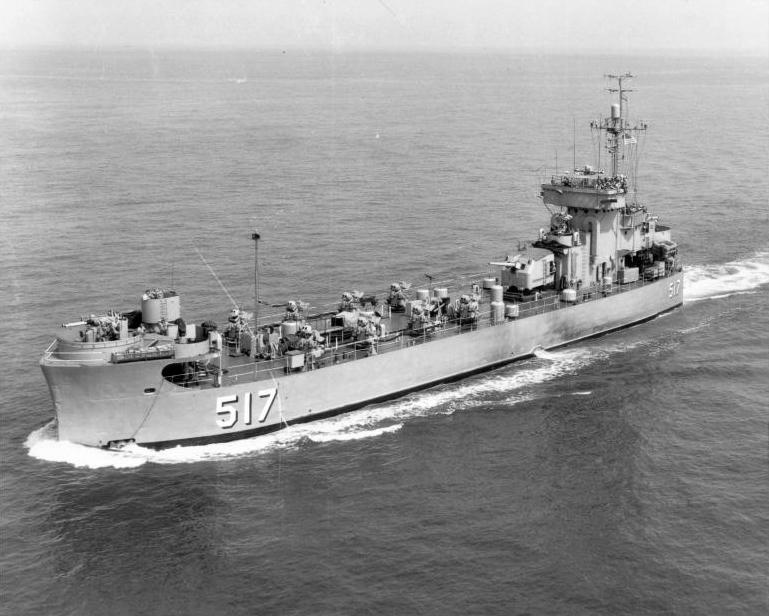
- LSM(R)-517 in 1954

History

United States
- Name: Sea Star (1945); LSM(R)-517 (1945–1955); Pee Dee River (1955–1960); Offshore Salvor (1960–1966); Petromar Salvor (1966–1967); Goldrill 4 (1977); Yukon Bleu (1977–1979); Sea Star (1979–2004); Western Sea (2004–2005); Fish Maker I (2005–
- Ordered: 1945, as LSM-517
- Builder: Brown Shipbuilding Company
- Laid down: 28 April 1945
- Launched: 2 June 1945
- Commissioned: 21 July 1945
- Decommissioned: 13 April 1955
- Renamed: Pee Dee River, 1 October 1955
- Reclassified: LSM(R)–517, 9 February 1945
- Stricken: 1 February 1960
- Fate: Sold to civilian concerns, 22 June 1960

General characteristics
- Class & type: LSM(R)-501-class landing ship medium
- Displacement: 758 long tons (770 t) light; 993 long tons (1,009 t) attack; 1,175 long tons (1,194 t) full
- Length: 203 ft 3 in (61.95 m)
- Beam: 34 ft 6 in (10.52 m)
- Draft: 5 ft 4 in (1.63 m) light; 6 ft 9 in (2.06 m) attack; 7 ft 9 in (2.36 m) full
- Propulsion: 2 × General Motors, nonreversing with airflex clutch, Cleveland diesels, 1,440 bhp (1,074 kW) each at 720 rpm, two screws
- Speed: 13 knots (24 km/h; 15 mph)
- Range: 3,000 nmi (5,600 km) at 13 kn (24 km/h; 15 mph)
- Complement: 6 officers, 137 enlisted
- Armament: 1 × 5"/38 caliber gun; 2 × twin 40 mm AA guns; 4 × twin 20 mm AA guns; 4 × 4.2 in (110 mm) mortars; 20 × continuous loading 5 in (130 mm) Ship-to-shore rocket launchers
- Armor: 10-lb. STS on conning station, pilot-house, radio room, radar plot, and rocket control; 10-lb. ASPP around 40 and 20 mm gun mounts and directors

USS Pee Dee River (LSM(R)-517), an LSM(R)-501-class landing ship medium (rocket) of the United States Navy, was originally designed as an LSM, but redesignated on 9 February 1945 as LSM(R)–517. She was laid down by Brown Shipbuilding Corporation, in Houston, Texas, on 28 April 1945 and launched 2 June 1945. She was accepted and commissioned on 21 July 1945.

== Service history ==
LSM(R)–517 underwent final fitting out at the Charleston Navy Yard in Charleston, South Carolina, and then reported for shakedown 25 August 1945 at Little Creek, Virginia. Assigned to the Amphibious Force, Atlantic Fleet, she conducted training operations out of Little Creek. She was used chiefly to assist in fulfilling amphibious and midshipman training commitments until her deactivation in October 1947.

Reactivated in September 1954, she called at Fall River, Massachusetts, for repairs and then operated briefly out of Little Creek in the Virginia Capes and Chesapeake Bay Operating Areas. After taking part in LantFlEx 1–55, she departed Little Creek on 1 February 1955 and arrived in Orange, Texas, on 8 February. She decommissioned there on 13 April and was assigned to the Atlantic Reserve Fleet, Texas Group.

Named Pee Dee River on 1 October 1955 while still in reserve status, she remained berthed at Orange, until struck from the Navy Register on 1 February 1960. She was sold on 22 June 1960 to Petrommer Corp., Rockport, Texas, for use as a shallow drilling ship. She was resold in 1989 to Western Sea Inc., of Seattle, Washington, for service as a fish factory ship and renamed Western Sea. Her final fate is unknown, although she is unlikely to be still in service.
