= USS LSM-478 =

LSM-1-class landing ship medium

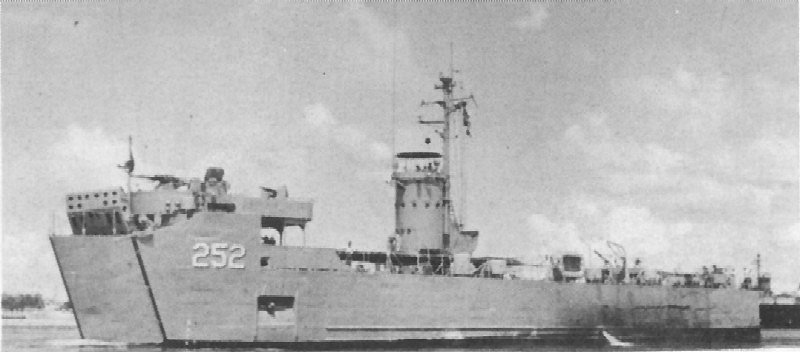
- ROCS Mei Kun

History

United States
- Name: LSM-478
- Builder: Brown Shipbuilding Co., Houston
- Laid down: 10 February 1945
- Launched: 3 March 1945
- Commissioned: 7 April 1945
- Decommissioned: 28 May 1946
- Honors and awards: See Awards
- Fate: Transferred to France, 1 April 1954

History

France
- Name: L9016
- Acquired: 1 April 1954
- Commissioned: 28 June 1954
- Decommissioned: April 1956
- Fate: Returned to US, April 1956

History

Taiwan
- Name: Mei Kun; (美功)
- Acquired: November 1956
- Commissioned: November 1956
- Decommissioned: 1973
- Reclassified: LSM-352
- Stricken: 1973
- Identification: Pennant number: LSM-252
- Fate: Unknown

General characteristics
- Class & type: LSM-1-class landing ship medium
- Displacement: 520 long tons (528 t) light; 743 long tons (755 t) landing; 1,095 long tons (1,113 t) full load
- Length: 203 ft 6 in (62.03 m) o/a
- Beam: 34 ft 6 in (10.52 m)
- Draft: 3 ft 6 in (1.07 m) forward; 7 ft 8 in (2.34 m) aft; Fully loaded : 6 ft 4 in (1.93 m) forward; 8 ft 3 in (2.51 m) aft
- Propulsion: 2 × Fairbanks-Morse (model 38D81/8X10, reversible with hydraulic clutch) diesels. Direct drive with 1,440 bhp (1,074 kW) each @ 720 rpm, twin screws
- Speed: 13.2 knots (15.2 mph; 24.4 km/h)
- Range: 4,900 nmi (9,100 km) at 12 kn (22 km/h)
- Capacity: 5 medium or 3 heavy tanks, or 6 LVTs, or 9 DUKWs
- Troops: 2 officers, 46 enlisted
- Complement: 5 officers, 54 enlisted
- Armament: 6 × 20 mm AA gun mounts
- Armour: 10-lb. STS splinter shield to gun mounts, pilot house and conning station

USS LSM-478 was a LSM-1-class landing ship medium in the United States Navy during World War II. The ship was transferred to France as L9016 and Taiwan as ROCS Mei Kun (LSM-252).

== Construction and career ==
LSM-478 was laid down on 10 February 1945 at Brown Shipbuilding Co., Houston, Texas. Launched on 3 March 1945 and commissioned on 7 April 1945.

During World War II, LSM-478 was assigned to the Asiatic-Pacific theater. She was assigned to occupation service in the Far East from 4 September to 9 November 1945.

LSM-478 was decommissioned on 28 May 1946.

She was loaned to the French on 1 April 1954.

She was struck from the Navy Register.

The ship was commissioned into the French Navy on 28 June 1954 and renamed L9016. She served in the First Indochina War later that year.

L9016 was returned to the US in April 1956 and then transferred to Taiwan in November 1956, in which she was commissioned in November 1956, as ROCS Mei Kun (LSM-252). She was later redesignated LSM-352.

Underneath the cover of the night in January 1957, the ship escaped China through Kinmen and small waterways of Jinmen to avoid Communist Army's radar. At 8 in the evening, she lifted her anchor and left Liuluo Bay for Taiwan.

The ship was put out of service in 1973 with her fate unknown.

== Awards ==
LST-478 have earned the following awards:

- American Campaign Medal
- Asiatic-Pacific Campaign Medal
- World War II Victory Medal
- Navy Occupation Service Medal (with Asia clasp)

== Sources ==
- United States. Dept. of the Treasury (1962). Treasury Decisions Under the Customs, Internal Revenue, Industrial Alcohol, Narcotic and Other Laws, Volume 97. U.S. Government Printing Office.
- Moore, Capt. John (1984). Jane's Fighting Ships 1984-85. Jane's Information Group. ISBN 978-0710607959.
- Saunders, Stephen (2009). Jane's Fighting Ships 2009-2010. Jane's Information Group. ISBN 978-0710628886.
- Fairplay International Shipping Journal Volume 222. United Kingdom: Fairplay Publishing Limited. 1967.
