= USS LSM-115 =

1944 LSM-1-class landing ship medium

History

United States
- Name: USS LSM-115
- Builder: Brown Ship Building Co., Houston, Texas
- Launched: 11 November 1944
- Commissioned: 2 December 1944
- Decommissioned: 19 June 1946
- Nickname(s): Super Mouse

General characteristics
- Class & type: LSM-1-class Landing Ship Medium
- Displacement: 520 long tons (528 t) light; 743 long tons (755 t) landing; 1,095 long tons (1,113 t) full
- Length: 203 ft 6 in (62.03 m) o/a
- Beam: 34 ft 6 in (10.52 m)
- Draft: Light : 3 ft 6 in (1.07 m) forward; 7 ft 8 in (2.34 m) aft; Fully loaded : 6 ft 4 in (1.93 m) forward; 8 ft 3 in (2.51 m) aft
- Propulsion: 2 × General Motors diesel engines, 1,440 bhp (1,074 kW) each at 720 rpm; 2 screws
- Speed: 13.2 knots (24.4 km/h; 15.2 mph)
- Range: 4,900 nmi (9,100 km) at 12 kn (22 km/h; 14 mph)
- Capacity: 5 medium or 3 heavy tanks, or 6 LVTs, or 9 DUKWs
- Troops: 2 officers, 46 enlisted
- Complement: 5 officers, 54 enlisted
- Armament: 1 × single bow mounted 40 mm AA gun; 4 × single 20 mm guns
- Armor: 10-lb. STS splinter shield to gun mounts, pilot house and conning station

USS LSM-115 was a LSM-1-class Landing Ship Medium of the United States Navy that saw active service in World War II in the Pacific Theater.

Built by the Brown Ship Building Co., Houston, Texas, the ship was commissioned on 2 December 1944.

== Service history ==
During World War II LSM-115 was assigned to service in China. Decommissioned on 19 June 1946, she was later sold to Charles Weaver & Co. of Detroit, MI. on 29 December 1946 and converted to a barge.

== Awards, citations and campaign ribbons ==
- China Service Medal (extended)
- American Campaign Medal
- Asiatic-Pacific Campaign Medal
- World War II Victory Medal
- National Defense Service Medal
