= USS LSM-247 =

1944nLSM-1-class landing ship medium

History

United States
- Builder: Western Pipe and Steel Company, San Pedro, California
- Commissioned: 16 November 1944
- Decommissioned: 2 May 1946
- Identification: IMO number: 5197614
- Fate: Sold in February 1947 to Ming-Sung Industrial Co., Ltd

General characteristics
- Class & type: LSM-1-class landing ship medium
- Displacement: 1,095 tons (f.)
- Length: 203 ft 6 in (62.03 m)
- Beam: 34 ft 6 in (10.52 m)
- Draft: 7 ft 4 in (2.24 m)
- Propulsion: two General Motors diesel engines, each 1,440 BHP
- Troops: 48
- Complement: 59
- Armament: 4 × 20mm gun mounts; 1 × bow 40mm gun
- Armor: gun mounts, pilot house and conning station protected by 10-lb. STS splinter shields

USS LSM-247 was a United States Navy landing ship of World War II.
