= USS LSM-149 =

1944 LSM-1-class landing ship medium

History

United States
- Name: USS LSM-149
- Builder: Charleston Navy Yard
- Laid down: 4 May 1944
- Launched: 27 May 1944
- Commissioned: 8 July 1944
- Fate: Damaged, 5 December or 14 December 1944; Declared total loss
- Decommissioned: 15 April 1945

General characteristics
- Class & type: LSM-1-class landing ship medium
- Displacement: 520 t.(light); 743 t. (landing); 1,095 t.(fully loaded)
- Length: 203 ft 6 in (62.0 m)
- Beam: 34 ft 6 in (10.52 m)
- Draft: 3 ft 6 in (1.07 m) fwd, 7 ft 8 in (2.34 m) aft; Fully loaded: 6 ft 4 in (1.93 m) fwd, 8 ft 3 in (2.51 m) aft
- Propulsion: 2 General Motors (non-reversible with airflex clutch) diesels; Direct drive with 1,440 BHP each @ 720rpm; twin screws
- Speed: 13.2 knots (24.4 km/h) (max.), (928 tons displacement)
- Endurance: 4,900 miles @ 12 knots, (928 tons displacement); (7,900 km @ 22 km/h)
- Capacity: 5 medium or 3 heavy tanks, or 6 LVT's, or 9 DUKW's
- Troops: 2 officers, 46 enlisted
- Complement: 5 officers, 54 enlisted
- Armament: 5 × 20 mm AA guns
- Armor: 10-lb. STS splinter shield to gun mounts, pilot house and conning station

USS LSM-149 was a LSM-1-class landing ship medium built for the U.S. Navy in World War II. Like most ships of her class, she was not named and known only by her designation.

LSM-149 was laid down at the Charleston Navy Yard on 4 May 1944, and was launched 27 May 1944. She was commissioned along with sister ship USS LSM-148 on 8 July 1944 by Rear Admiral Jules James.

Assigned to the Pacific Theatre, LSM-149 was damaged and breached while attempting to recover a barge in heavy surf off Sansapor, New Guinea on 30–31 July 1944. LSM-149 was grounded off the Philippines on 5 December 1944. (According to the United States Navy this happened on 14 December 1944, but her fate has also been reported as on 5 December 1944.) She was declared a total loss, and decommissioned on 15 April 1945.
