= USS LSM(R)-519 =

1945 LSM(R)-501-class landing ship medium (rocket)

- LMS(R)-519 moored in Troy/Albany N.Y. on 27 October 1945

History

United States
- Builder: Brown Shipbuilding Company
- Laid down: 28 April 1945
- Launched: 2 June 1945
- Commissioned: 28 July 1945
- Decommissioned: March 1946
- Renamed: USS Powder River, 1 October 1955
- Stricken: 1 October 1958

General characteristics
- Class & type: LSM(R)-501-class landing ship medium
- Displacement: 1,084 long tons (1,101 t)
- Length: 206 ft 3 in (62.87 m)
- Beam: 34 ft 6 in (10.52 m)
- Draft: 7 ft 2 in (2.18 m) mean
- Speed: 13 knots (24 km/h; 15 mph)
- Complement: 138
- Armament: 1 × 5"/38 caliber gun; 4 × 40 mm AA guns; 4 × 20 mm AA guns

USS LSM(R)–519 was an LSM(R)-501-class landing ship medium (rocket), a type of amphibious assault ship in the United States Navy.

She was originally projected as LSM-519 and was laid down on 28 April 1945 by the Brown Shipbuilding Co., Inc., in Houston, Texas. She was launched on 2 June 1945 and commissioned on 28 July.

== Service history ==
Following preliminary shakedown off Galveston, Texas, LSM(R)–519, steamed to Charleston, South Carolina, thence to Little Creek, Virginia, for completion of training. On 23 October she departed Little Creek for Troy, New York, where she conducted Navy Day activities.

By 1 November she was back in the tidewater area and on the 5th she sailed south. She arrived at the St. Johns River Florida Reserve Berthing Area on 9 November.

In March 1946 she was decommissioned. Renamed the Powder River on 1 October 1955, after the Powder River in Wyoming and Montana. The LSM(R) remained in the Florida Group, Atlantic Reserve Fleet until struck from the Navy List on 1 October 1958.
