= USS LSM-338 =

LSM-1-class landing ship medium

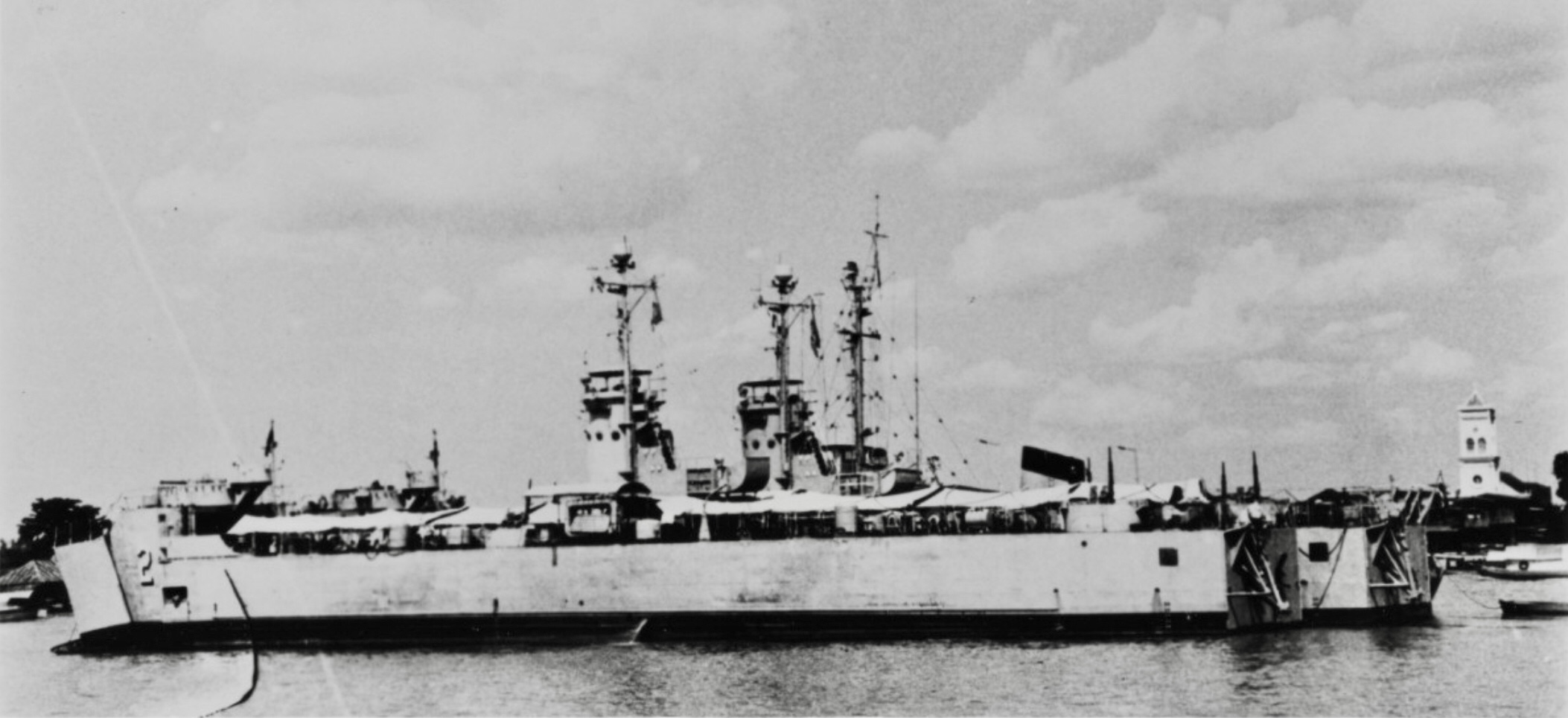
- HTMS Phai

History

United States
- Name: LSM-338
- Builder: Pullman Co., Chicago
- Laid down: 14 August 1944
- Launched: 5 December 1944
- Commissioned: 10 January 1945
- Decommissioned: 28 July 1946
- Honors and awards: See Awards
- Fate: Transferred to Thailand, 14 October 1946

History

Thailand
- Name: Phai
- Namesake: Phai Island
- Acquired: 14 October 1946
- Commissioned: 10 November 1947
- Decommissioned: 2004
- Identification: Pennant number: LSM-2
- Fate: Scrapped

General characteristics
- Class & type: LSM-1-class landing ship medium
- Displacement: 520 long tons (528 t) light; 743 long tons (755 t) landing; 1,095 long tons (1,113 t) full load
- Length: 203 ft 6 in (62.03 m) o/a
- Beam: 34 ft 6 in (10.52 m)
- Draft: 3 ft 6 in (1.07 m) forward; 7 ft 8 in (2.34 m) aft; Fully loaded : 6 ft 4 in (1.93 m) forward; 8 ft 3 in (2.51 m) aft
- Propulsion: 2 × Fairbanks-Morse (model 38D81/8X10, reversible with hydraulic clutch) diesels. Direct drive with 1,440 bhp (1,074 kW) each @ 720 rpm, twin screws
- Speed: 13.2 knots (15.2 mph; 24.4 km/h)
- Range: 4,900 nmi (9,100 km) at 12 kn (22 km/h)
- Capacity: 5 medium or 3 heavy tanks, or 6 LVTs, or 9 DUKWs
- Troops: 2 officers, 46 enlisted
- Complement: 5 officers, 54 enlisted
- Armament: 6 × 20 mm AA gun mounts
- Armour: 10-lb. STS splinter shield to gun mounts, pilot house and conning station

USS LSM-338 was a LSM-1-class landing ship medium in the United States Navy during World War II. The ship was transferred to Thailand and renamed HTMS Phai (LSM-2) (Thai: เรือหลวงไผ่).

== Construction and career ==
LSM-338 was laid down on 14 August 1944 at Pullman Co., Chicago, Illinois. Launched on 5 December 1944 and commissioned on 10 January 1945.

During World War II, LSM-338 was assigned to the Asiatic-Pacific theater. She took part in the occupation service in the Far East from 20 September 1945 to 20 July 1946.

LSM-338 was decommissioned on 28 July 1946 and later transferred to Thailand on 14 October, later that year.

She was struck from the Navy Register.

The ship was commissioned into the Royal Thai Navy on 10 November 1947 and renamed HTMS Phai (LSM-2). She was used as spare parts for her sister ship, HTMS Kut.

The ship was then sold for scrap and her conning tower is on display at the Royal Thai Naval Training Base.

== Awards ==
LST-338 have earned the following awards:

- American Campaign Medal
- Asiatic-Pacific Campaign Medal
- Navy Occupation Service Medal (with Asia clasp)
- World War II Victory Medal

== Sources ==
- United States. Dept. of the Treasury (1962). Treasury Decisions Under the Customs, Internal Revenue, Industrial Alcohol, Narcotic and Other Laws, Volume 97. U.S. Government Printing Office.
- Moore, Capt. John (1984). Jane's Fighting Ships 1984-85. Jane's Information Group. ISBN 978-0710607959.
- Saunders, Stephen (2009). Jane's Fighting Ships 2009-2010. Jane's Information Group. ISBN 978-0710628886.
- Fairplay International Shipping Journal Volume 222. United Kingdom: Fairplay Publishing Limited. 1967.
