= USS LSM-105 =

LSM-1-class landing ship of the United States Navy

History

United States
- Name: USS LSM-105
- Ordered: 15 September 1943
- Builder: Brown Shipbuilding Co., Houston, Texas
- Laid down: 30 July 1944
- Launched: 21 October 1944
- Commissioned: 15 November 1944
- Decommissioned: 20 June 1946
- Stricken: 27 August 1957
- Fate: Sold 10 December 1958

USS LSM-105 was a LSM-1-class landing ship medium of the United States Navy, commissioned at Brown Shipyards in Houston, Texas, on 15 November 1944. During the remainder of World War II, it served in the Pacific.
