= USS LSM-236 =

1944 LSM-1-class landing ship medium

History

United States
- Name: USS LSM-236
- Builder: Western Pipe and Steel Company, San Pedro, California
- Launched: 4 July 1944
- Commissioned: 2 September 1944
- Decommissioned: 15 July 1946
- Recommissioned: 8 September 1950
- Decommissioned: 17 October 1955
- Honors and awards: 1 battle star (Korea)
- Fate: Transferred to the Philippines, 15 September 1960

Philippines
- Name: RPS Batanes (L-65)
- Acquired: 15 September 1960
- Fate: Scrapped, 1972

General characteristics
- Class & type: LSM-1-class Landing Ship Medium
- Displacement: 520 long tons (528 t) light; 743 long tons (755 t) landing; 1,095 long tons (1,113 t) full
- Length: 203 ft 6 in (62.03 m) o/a
- Beam: 34 ft 6 in (10.52 m)
- Draft: Light : 3 ft 6 in (1.07 m) forward; 7 ft 8 in (2.34 m) aft; Fully loaded : 6 ft 4 in (1.93 m) forward; 8 ft 3 in (2.51 m) aft
- Propulsion: 2 × General Motors diesel engines, 1,440 bhp (1,074 kW) each at 720 rpm; 2 screws
- Speed: 13.2 knots (24.4 km/h; 15.2 mph)
- Range: 4,900 nmi (9,100 km) at 12 kn (22 km/h; 14 mph)
- Capacity: 5 medium or 3 heavy tanks, or 6 LVTs, or 9 DUKWs
- Troops: 2 officers, 46 enlisted
- Complement: 5 officers, 54 enlisted
- Armament: 1 × single bow mounted 40 mm AA gun; 4 × single 20 mm guns
- Armor: 10-lb. STS splinter shield to gun mounts, pilot house and conning station

USS LSM-236 was a LSM-1-class Landing Ship Medium of the United States Navy that saw active service in World War II and the Korean War.

Built by the Western Pipe and Steel Company, San Pedro, California, the ship was commissioned on 2 September 1944.

== Service history ==
During World War II LSM-236 was assigned to the Asiatic-Pacific Theater, and following the war performed occupation duty in the Far East. Decommissioned on 15 July 1946 she was laid up in the Reserve Fleet.

LSM-236 was recommissioned on 8 September 1950 for service in the Korean War, and decommissioned on 17 October 1955 at Astoria, Oregon.

Laid up in the Pacific Reserve Fleet, Columbia River Group, Astoria, she was struck from the Naval Register, and transferred to the Philippines on 15 September 1960, serving as RPS Batanes (L-65). Batanes ran aground and declared a total loss in June 1971, and was scrapped in 1972.

== Awards, citations and campaign ribbons ==
LSM-236 earned one battle star for Korean War service.

- American Campaign Medal
- Asiatic-Pacific Campaign Medal
- World War II Victory Medal
- Navy Occupation Service Medal (with Asia clasp)
- National Defense Service Medal
- Korean Service Medal
- United Nations Service Medal
- Republic of Korea War Service Medal (retroactive)
