= USS LSM-469 =

LSM-1-class landing ship medium

Coordinates: 12.932583°N 100.693183°E

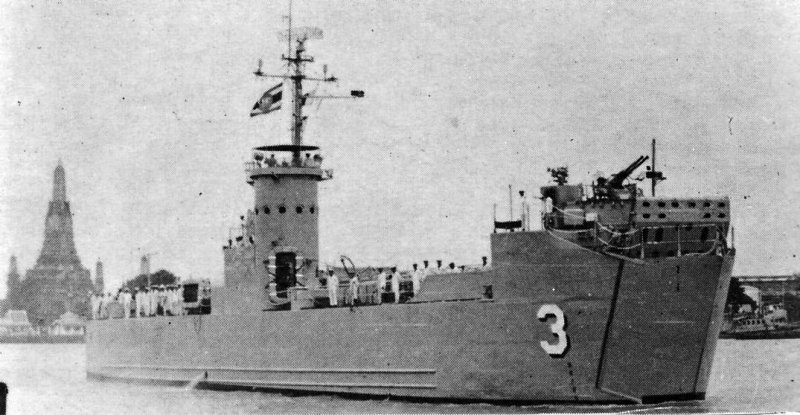
- HTMS Kram

History

United States
- Name: LSM-469
- Builder: Brown Shipbuilding Co., Houston
- Laid down: 27 January 1945
- Launched: 17 February 1945
- Commissioned: 17 March 1945
- Decommissioned: 29 August 1946
- Honors and awards: See Awards
- Fate: Transferred to Thailand, 25 May 1962

History

Thailand
- Name: Kram; (คราม)
- Namesake: Khram Island
- Acquired: 25 May 1962
- Commissioned: 12 July 1962
- Decommissioned: 26 February 2002
- Reclassified: LSM-732
- Identification: Pennant number: LSM-3
- Fate: Sunk as artificial reef, 1 February 2003

General characteristics
- Class & type: LSM-1-class landing ship medium
- Displacement: 520 long tons (528 t) light; 743 long tons (755 t) landing; 1,095 long tons (1,113 t) full load
- Length: 203 ft 6 in (62.03 m) o/a
- Beam: 34 ft 6 in (10.52 m)
- Draft: 3 ft 6 in (1.07 m) forward; 7 ft 8 in (2.34 m) aft; Fully loaded : 6 ft 4 in (1.93 m) forward; 8 ft 3 in (2.51 m) aft
- Propulsion: 2 × Fairbanks-Morse (model 38D81/8X10, reversible with hydraulic clutch) diesels. Direct drive with 1,440 bhp (1,074 kW) each @ 720 rpm, twin screws
- Speed: 13.2 knots (15.2 mph; 24.4 km/h)
- Range: 4,900 nmi (9,100 km) at 12 kn (22 km/h)
- Capacity: 5 medium or 3 heavy tanks, or 6 LVTs, or 9 DUKWs
- Troops: 2 officers, 46 enlisted
- Complement: 5 officers, 54 enlisted
- Armament: 6 × 20 mm AA gun mounts
- Armour: 10-lb. STS splinter shield to gun mounts, pilot house and conning station

USS LSM-469 was a LSM-1-class landing ship medium in the United States Navy during World War II. The ship was transferred to Thailand and renamed HTMS Kram (LSM-3) (Thai: เรือหลวงคราม).

== Construction and career ==
LSM-469 was laid down on 27 January 1945 at Brown Shipbuilding Co., Houston, Texas. Launched on 17 February 1945 and commissioned on 17 March 1945.

During World War II, LSM-469 was assigned to the Asiatic-Pacific theater. She took part in the occupation service in the Far East from 20 September 1945 to 11 April 1946.

LSM-469 was decommissioned on 29 August 1946 and later transferred to Thailand on 25 May 1962.

She was struck from the Navy Register.

The ship was commissioned into the Royal Thai Navy on 12 July 1962 and renamed HTMS Kram (LSM-3). She was later redesignated as LSM-732, later in her career.

The ship was decommissioned on 26 February 2002 and to be sunk as an artificial reef off Pattaya on 1 February 2003.

== Awards ==
LST-469 have earned the following awards:

- American Campaign Medal
- Asiatic-Pacific Campaign Medal
- Navy Occupation Service Medal
- World War II Victory Medal

== Sources ==
- United States. Dept. of the Treasury (1962). Treasury Decisions Under the Customs, Internal Revenue, Industrial Alcohol, Narcotic and Other Laws, Volume 97. U.S. Government Printing Office.
- Moore, Capt. John (1984). Jane's Fighting Ships 1984-85. Jane's Information Group. ISBN 978-0710607959.
- Saunders, Stephen (2009). Jane's Fighting Ships 2009-2010. Jane's Information Group. ISBN 978-0710628886.
- Fairplay International Shipping Journal Volume 222. United Kingdom: Fairplay Publishing Limited. 1967.
