= USS Greenbrier River =

1945 LSM(R)-501-class landing ship medium

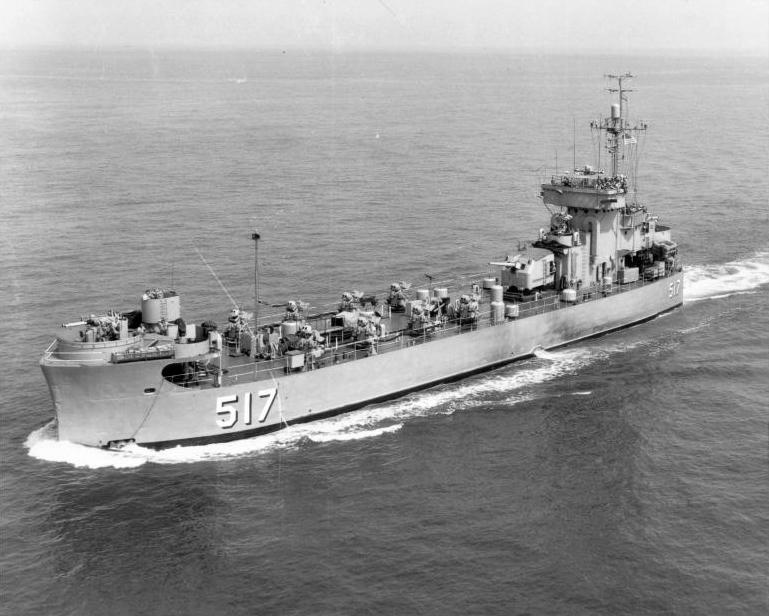
- Shown:USS Pee Dee River (LSM(R)-517)

History

United States
- Name: USS LSM(R)-507
- Namesake: Greenbrier River
- Builder: Brown Shipbuilding Company
- Laid down: 31 March 1945
- Launched: 28 April 1945
- Commissioned: 22 June 1945
- Decommissioned: 5 February 1947
- Renamed: Greenbrier River, 1 October 1955
- Stricken: 1 October 1958

General characteristics
- Class & type: LSM(R)-501-class landing ship medium
- Displacement: 1,175 long tons (1,194 t) full
- Length: 203 ft 6 in (62.03 m)
- Beam: 34 ft (10 m)
- Draft: 7 ft 9 in (2.36 m)
- Propulsion: General Motors Cleveland diesel, 2,800 hp (2,088 kW), 2 screws; direct drive
- Speed: 13 knots (24 km/h; 15 mph)
- Range: 5,000 nmi (9,300 km) at 7 kn (13 km/h; 8.1 mph)
- Complement: 6 officers, 137 enlisted
- Armament: 1 × 5"/38 caliber gun; 2 × 40 mm AA guns; 4 × 20 mm AA guns; 4 × 4.2 in mortars; 20 × continuous loading 5 in (130 mm) Ship-to-Shore rocket launchers

USS LSM(R)-507 was laid down on 31 March 1945 by the Brown Shipbuilding Company in Houston, Texas and launched on 28 April 1945. She was commissioned by the United States Navy on 22 June 1945.

== Service history ==
Departing Houston on 27 June, LSM(R)-507 steamed via Galveston, Texas to Charleston, South Carolina, where she arrived on 7 July. From 28 to 30 July she sailed to Little Creek, Virginia, for training in Chesapeake Bay and along the Virginia coast. Assigned to LSMR Squadron 4, she departed Little Creek on 4 October for the Great Lakes. She touched at Halifax, Quebec and Montreal and arrived at Rochester, New York, on 16 October. During the next three weeks she sailed to Detroit and Chicago before returning to Rochester on 1 November and Little Creek on 17 November.

During the next two months LSM(R)-507 continued operations out of Little Creek. She departed on 29 January 1946, for operations off San Juan, Puerto Rico and later out of Guantanamo Bay in Cuba. She returned to Little Creek on 24 March.

Following duty out of Norfolk, Virginia and Baltimore, Maryland, LSM(R)-507 departed Little Creek for the West Coast of the United States on 18 October, arriving in San Diego, California on 20 November. Assigned to LSMR Squadron 3, she operated out of San Diego; she was decommissioned there on 5 February 1947 and entered the Pacific Reserve Fleet. While berthed at San Diego, she was named Greenbrier River on 1 October 1955, after the Greenbrier River (a tributary of the New River). Her name was struck from the Naval Vessel Register on 1 October 1958.
