= USS LSM-125 =

LSM-1-class landing ship medium

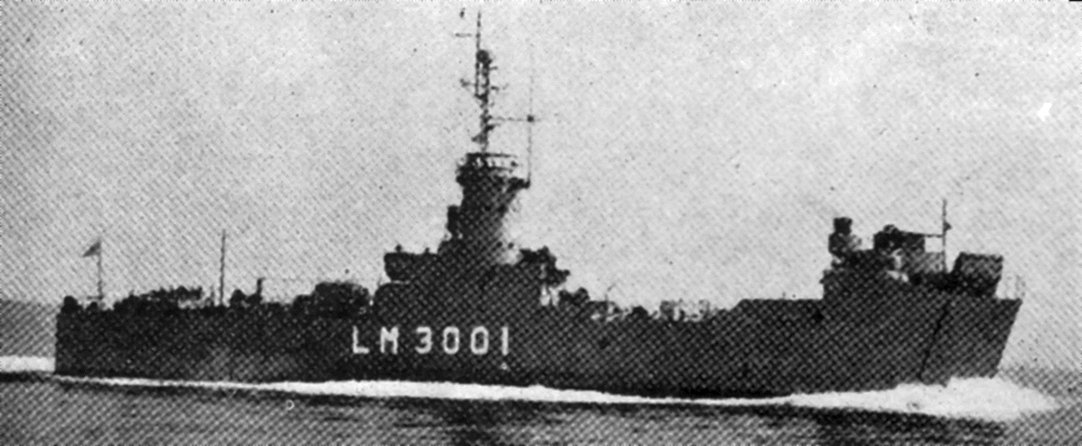
- JDS LSM-3001

History

United States
- Name: LSM-125
- Builder: Brown Shipbuilding Co., Houston
- Laid down: 4 November 1944
- Launched: 25 November 1944
- Commissioned: 22 December 1944
- Decommissioned: 18 December 1946
- Recommissioned: 14 October 1950
- Decommissioned: 20 January 1954
- Identification: Callsign: NVJP
- Honors and awards: See Awards
- Fate: Transferred to France, 22 January 1954

History

France
- Name: L9013
- Acquired: 22 January 1954
- Commissioned: 28 June 1954
- Decommissioned: July 1956
- Fate: Returned to US, 16 July 1956

History

Japan
- Name: LSM-3001
- Acquired: 18 July 1957
- Decommissioned: 1974
- Fate: Scrapped, 4 October 1977

General characteristics
- Class & type: LSM-1-class landing ship medium
- Displacement: 520 long tons (528 t) light; 743 long tons (755 t) landing; 1,095 long tons (1,113 t) full load
- Length: 203 ft 6 in (62.03 m) o/a
- Beam: 34 ft 6 in (10.52 m)
- Draft: 3 ft 6 in (1.07 m) forward; 7 ft 8 in (2.34 m) aft; Fully loaded : 6 ft 4 in (1.93 m) forward; 8 ft 3 in (2.51 m) aft
- Propulsion: 2 × Fairbanks-Morse (model 38D81/8X10, reversible with hydraulic clutch) diesels. Direct drive with 1,440 bhp (1,074 kW) each @ 720 rpm, twin screws
- Speed: 13.2 knots (15.2 mph; 24.4 km/h)
- Range: 4,900 nmi (9,100 km) at 12 kn (22 km/h)
- Capacity: 5 medium or 3 heavy tanks, or 6 LVTs, or 9 DUKWs
- Troops: 2 officers, 46 enlisted
- Complement: 5 officers, 54 enlisted
- Armament: 6 × 20 mm AA gun mounts
- Armour: 10-lb. STS splinter shield to gun mounts, pilot house and conning station

USS LSM-125 was a LSM-1-class landing ship medium in the United States Navy during World War II. The ship was transferred to France as L9013 and Japan as JDS LSM-3001.

== Construction and career ==
LSM-125 was laid down on 4 November 1944 at Brown Shipbuilding Co., Houston, Texas. Launched on 25 November 1944 and commissioned on 22 December 1944.

During World War II, LSM-125 was assigned to the Asiatic-Pacific theater. She took part in the Battle of Okinawa from 28 April to 18 May 1945. After the war, she was assigned to occupation service in the Far East from 2 September to 12 October 1945 and 26 October to 8 December 1945.

LSM-125 was decommissioned on 18 December 1946, but was recommissioned on 14 October 1950 amid the Korean War. The ship took part in the Korean Defense Summer-Fall 1952 from 16 to 18 October 1952 and the Third Korean Winter from 24 January to 2 February 1953.

She was put out of service on 22 January 1954 and handed over to the French on the same day at Mare Island Naval Shipyard.

She was struck from the Navy Register.

The ship was commissioned into the French Navy on 28 June 1954 and renamed L9013. She later took part in the first Indochina War.

L9013 returned to US custody on 16 July 1956, and two days later, transferred to Japan and renamed JDS LSM-3001. The ship has been in her original configuration and was never modified. The Maritime Self-Defense Force did not give a ship name in particular and just assigned a number.

She was decommissioned in 1974 and later sold for scrap on 4 October 1977 by Kitajima Shokoi Company, Kyushu.

== Awards ==
LST-125 have earned these awards:

- American Campaign Medal
- Asiatic-Pacific Campaign Medal (1 battle star)
- World War II Victory Medal
- Navy Occupation Service Medal (with Asia clasp)
- National Defense Service Medal
- Korean Service Medal (2 battle stars)
- United Nations Service Medal
- Republic of Korea War Service Medal
