= USS Saint Croix River =

1945 LSM(R)-501-class landing ship medium (rocket)

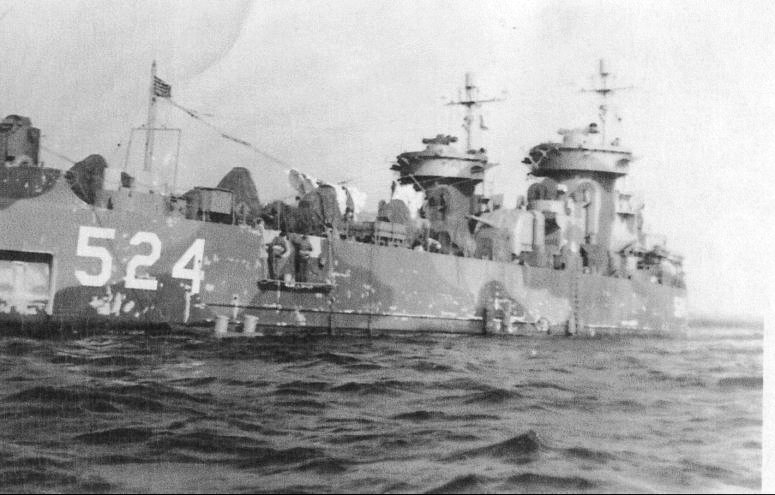
- Saint Croix River at Green Cove Springs, Florida prior to decommissioning.

History

United States
- Name: USS Saint Croix River
- Namesake: St. Croix River
- Awarded: 1 October 1955
- Builder: Brown Shipbuilding Company
- Laid down: 5 May 1945
- Launched: 9 June 1945
- Christened: LSMR-524
- Commissioned: 14 August 1945
- Decommissioned: 21 May 1946
- Stricken: 1 October 1958
- Honors and awards: American Campaign Medal; World War II Victory Medal
- Fate: Sold in 1961 – fate unknown

General characteristics
- Class & type: Landing Ship Medium
- Displacement: appx. 758 tons
- Length: 206 ft (63 m)
- Beam: 34 ft (10 m)
- Draft: 5 ft (1.5 m)
- Propulsion: 2 x General Motors diesel engines
- Speed: 13 knots
- Range: 3,000 miles
- Complement: 6 officers, 137 enlisted
- Armament: 1 × 5-inch/38 gun; 2 × twin 40mm guns; 4 × twin 20mm guns; 10 × 5-inch SS rocket launchers; 4 × 4-inch .2 mortars
- Armor: 10 lb (4.5 kg)

USS Saint Croix River (LSM(R)-524) was a rocket-equipped Landing Ship of the United States Navy during World War II.

Saint Croix River was laid down a few days before the end of the Second World War on 5 May 1945. Build in Houston, Texas, Saint Croix River was launched on 9 June, and initially commissioned on 14 August as USS LSMR-524 before being awarded the name of the St. Croix River between Maine and Canadian New Brunswick in 1955. Despite earning the American and World War II campaign decorations, Saint Croix River never saw action nor traveled further than the Chesapeake Bay or the Gulf Coast of the United States. The ship was sold in 1961, with her subsequent fate unknown.

== Career ==
Saint Croix River was laid down on 5 May 1945 in Houston under the contact of the Brown Shipbuilding Company based there. Construction took a mere four weeks, and she was launched on 9 June along with her 143-man crew recently arrived from the training courses in Little Creek, Norfolk, Virginia. Commissioned LSMR-524 on 14 August 1945 during a ceremony at the Southern Pacific Docks in Houston and had her previously absent 5" SS rocket launchers installed. She underwent her shakedown cruise along the Gulf Coast of the United States and off the coast of Virginia in September 1945. She then sailed to Florida, practicing live fire exercises of her all weapons en route to joining the Atlantic Reserve Fleet. She also engaged in similar training during a subsequent journey to the Chesapeake Bay before returning to Florida. Two log reports from January and March 1946 survive:

Moored at Berth Oak 31, St. John's River, Green Cove Springs, Fla. in 14 feet of water, mud bottom, with 35 fathoms of chain to bow anchor, 300 feet of cable to the stern anchor and moored port side to the USS LSM(R) 523 moored to the starboard side, the starboard side to the USS LSM (R) 525 moored to the port, port side to, USS LSM (R) 527 moored to the USS LSM (R) 525, USS LSM (R) 526 moored to LSM (R) 527, USS LSM (R) 519 moored to starboard side of USS LSM (R) 526 on the following Bridge bearing 166 (T), North End of bridge 068 (T), tower 219 (T) with the following machinery in operation #1 ship service generator, #1 boiler, #2 refrigerator, #2 fresh water pump, #2 fire and flushing pump, #2 air compressor.

Moored in Birth Oak 31, St. Johns River Green Cove Springs. Fla. Anchorage in 14 feet of water, mud bottom with 65 fathoms of chain to bow anchor and 495 feet of cable to the stern anchor. Nested with LSM (R) type ships: 523, 530, 533, 520, 534, 535, 536, 531, 522, 528, 521, and 529, moored to our starboard numbering from inboard to outboard. LSM(R) type ships: 525, 527, 526, and 519, moored to our port numbering from inboard to outboard, on the following bearing: bridge opening 180 .5 (T), signal tower 235 (T), pt. of land 336 (T). The following machinery in operation: #1 generator, #1 evaporator, #2 fire & flushing pumps, #2 fresh water pumps, #2 refrigeration unit.

She was decommissioned on 21 May 1946, and remained laid-up in Florida until 1 October 1955, where she was recommissioned with her full name, whereupon she continued serve in the US Navy's Reserve Fleet until being struck from the register on 1 October 1958. She remained in dock until 1961, whereupon she was sold.
