= USS LSM-297 =

Landing ship of the United States Navy from 1944 to 1957

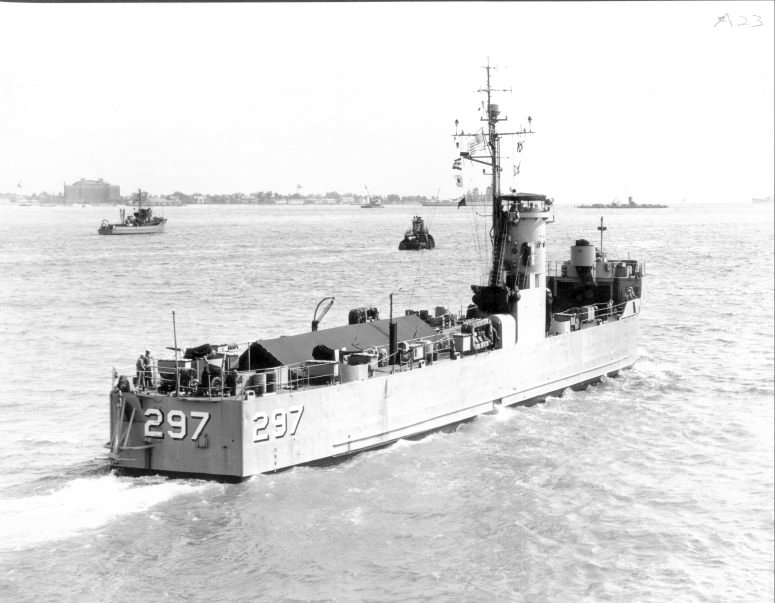
- LSM-297

History

United States
- Name: USS LSM-297
- Builder: Charleston Navy Yard, South Carolina
- Laid down: 5 October 1944
- Launched: 30 October 1944
- Commissioned: 18 December 1944
- Decommissioned: 4 November 1957
- Fate: Sold for scrapping November 1958

General characteristics
- Class & type: LSM-1-class Landing Ship Medium
- Displacement: 520 long tons (528 t) empty; 1,095 long tons (1,113 t) full load
- Length: 203 ft 6 in (62.03 m)
- Beam: 34 ft 6 in (10.52 m)
- Draft: Landing : 3 ft 6 in (1.07 m) forward; 7 ft 8 in (2.34 m) aft; Full load : 6 ft 4 in (1.93 m) forward; 8 ft 3 in (2.51 m) aft
- Propulsion: 2 Fairbanks-Morse diesel engines, 2,800 shp (2,088 kW), direct drive, 2 screws
- Speed: 13.2 knots (24.4 km/h; 15.2 mph)
- Range: 4,900 nmi (9,100 km) at 12 knots (22 km/h; 14 mph)
- Capacity: 5 × medium tanks or; 3 × heavy tanks or; 6 × LVTs or; 9 × DUKWs
- Troops: 2 officers, 46 enlisted
- Complement: 5 officers, 54 enlisted
- Armament: 1 × single 40 mm AA gun; 4 × single 20 mm AA guns

USS LSM-297 was a LSM-1-class medium landing ship built for the United States Navy during World War II.

== Career ==
USS LSM-297 was laid down on 5 October 1944 at Charleston Navy Yard in South Carolina and was launched on 30 October 1944. She was commissioned on 18 December 1944.

During World War II LSM-297 was assigned to the Pacific Theater. She was decommissioned on 4 November 1957 at Astoria, Oregon, and sold for scrapping in November 1958.
