= USS LSM-46 =

LSM-1-class landing ship medium

Coordinates: 45.1931570°N 66.2715667°W

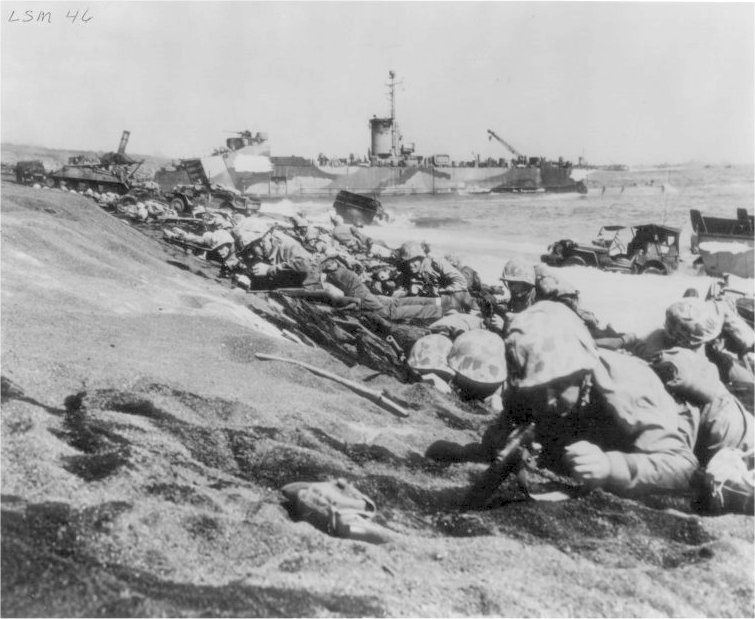
- USS LSM-46

History

United States
- Name: LSM-46
- Builder: Brown Shipbuilding Co., Houston
- Laid down: 6 June 1944
- Launched: 30 June 1944
- Commissioned: 1 August 1944
- Decommissioned: 18 March 1946
- Stricken: 12 April 1946
- Identification: Callsign: NVDM
- Honors and awards: See Awards
- Fate: Sold to merchant service, 23 October 1948

General characteristics
- Class & type: LSM-1-class landing ship medium
- Displacement: 520 long tons (528 t) light; 743 long tons (755 t) landing; 1,095 long tons (1,113 t) full load
- Length: 203 ft 6 in (62.03 m) o/a
- Beam: 34 ft 6 in (10.52 m)
- Draft: 3 ft 6 in (1.07 m) forward; 7 ft 8 in (2.34 m) aft; Fully loaded : 6 ft 4 in (1.93 m) forward; 8 ft 3 in (2.51 m) aft
- Propulsion: 2 × Fairbanks-Morse (model 38D81/8X10, reversible with hydraulic clutch) diesels. Direct drive with 1,440 bhp (1,074 kW) each @ 720 rpm, twin screws
- Speed: 13.2 knots (15.2 mph; 24.4 km/h)
- Range: 4,900 nmi (9,100 km) at 12 kn (22 km/h)
- Capacity: 5 medium or 3 heavy tanks, or 6 LVTs, or 9 DUKWs
- Troops: 2 officers, 46 enlisted
- Complement: 5 officers, 54 enlisted
- Armament: 6 × 20 mm AA gun mounts
- Armour: 10-lb. STS splinter shield to gun mounts, pilot house and conning station

USS LSM-46 was a LSM-1-class landing ship medium in the United States Navy during World War II.

== Construction and career ==
LSM-46 was laid down on 6 June 1944 at Brown Shipbuilding Co., Houston, Texas. Launched on 30 June 1944 and commissioned on 1 August 1944.

During World War II, LSM-46 was assigned to the Asiatic-Pacific theater. She took part in the Battle of Iwo Jima from 19 February to 26 March 1945. The ship carried supplies and marines to and back from the beach. Moreover, injured marines were brought on board to be transferred to hospital ship, USS Samaritan. On the evening of 23 February, while beached on Red beach, and while the 40 mm gunners on her bow were exchanging fire with Japanese gunners in Mount. Suribachi, she was struck by a 105 mm round at the forward 50 cal. machine gun on the port side. This round killed two men instantly and wounded seventeen men, two dying later. Her starboard side was hit below the water line by a second artillery round. There were no injuries from that hit. She received the Navy Unit Commendation for her actions at the Battle of Iwo Jima.

LSM-46 was decommissioned on 18 March 1946 at Norfolk Navy Yard, Portsmouth.

She was struck from the Navy Register on 12 April 1946.

The ship was later sold on 23 October 1948 as military surplus, to Charles N. Wilson for St. John Tugboat Company in East Saint John, New Brunswick, Canada. LSM-56, LSM-78 and LSM-89 were also sold to the same owner to be used as barges.

They were all put out of service in 1960 and sold for scrap. Halfway through the scrapping process, the ships were abandoned thus her together with LSM-56 remained at the Musquash estuary. They are now part of the landscape and a point of interest. Another unidentified LSM is present in the middle of the river, capsized in place.

== Awards ==
LST-46 have earned the following awards:

- American Campaign Medal
- Navy Unit Commendation
- Asiatic-Pacific Campaign Medal (1 battle star)
- Combat Action Ribbon
- World War II Victory Medal
- [ Purple heart ]

== Sources ==
- United States. Dept. of the Treasury (1962). Treasury Decisions Under the Customs, Internal Revenue, Industrial Alcohol, Narcotic and Other Laws, Volume 97. U.S. Government Printing Office.
- Moore, Capt. John (1984). Jane's Fighting Ships 1984-85. Jane's Information Group. ISBN 978-0710607959.
- Saunders, Stephen (2009). Jane's Fighting Ships 2009-2010. Jane's Information Group. ISBN 978-0710628886.
- Fairplay International Shipping Journal Volume 222. United Kingdom: Fairplay Publishing Limited. 1967.
