= USS LSM-110 =

LSM-1-class landing ship medium

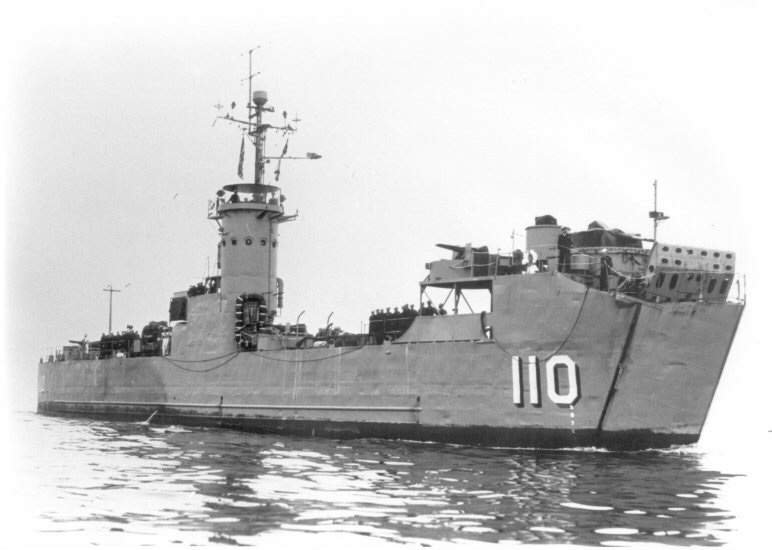
- USS LSM-110

History

United States
- Name: LSM-110
- Builder: Brown Shipbuilding Co., Houston
- Laid down: 7 October 1944
- Launched: 28 October 1944
- Commissioned: 25 November 1944
- Decommissioned: 2 January 1947
- Recommissioned: 19 September 1950
- Identification: Callsign: NVIK
- Honors and awards: See Awards
- Fate: Transferred to France, 22 January 1954

History

France
- Name: L9012
- Acquired: 22 January 1954
- Commissioned: 28 June 1954
- Decommissioned: October 1955
- Fate: Transferred to South Vietnam, October 1955

History

South Vietnam
- Name: Hàn Giang
- Acquired: October 1955
- Commissioned: December 1955
- Decommissioned: May 1975
- Identification: Pennant number: HQ-401
- Fate: Transferred to Philippines, May 1975

History

Philippines
- Acquired: 17 November 1975
- Fate: Scrapped, 9 June 1976

General characteristics
- Class & type: LSM-1-class landing ship medium
- Displacement: 520 long tons (528 t) light; 743 long tons (755 t) landing; 1,095 long tons (1,113 t) full load
- Length: 203 ft 6 in (62.03 m) o/a
- Beam: 34 ft 6 in (10.52 m)
- Draft: 3 ft 6 in (1.07 m) forward; 7 ft 8 in (2.34 m) aft; Fully loaded : 6 ft 4 in (1.93 m) forward; 8 ft 3 in (2.51 m) aft
- Propulsion: 2 × Fairbanks-Morse (model 38D81/8X10, reversible with hydraulic clutch) diesels. Direct drive with 1,440 bhp (1,074 kW) each @ 720 rpm, twin screws
- Speed: 13.2 knots (15.2 mph; 24.4 km/h)
- Range: 4,900 nmi (9,100 km) at 12 kn (22 km/h)
- Capacity: 5 medium or 3 heavy tanks, or 6 LVTs, or 9 DUKWs
- Troops: 2 officers, 46 enlisted
- Complement: 5 officers, 54 enlisted
- Armament: 6 × 20 mm AA gun mounts
- Armour: 10-lb. STS splinter shield to gun mounts, pilot house and conning station

USS LSM-110 was a LSM-1-class landing ship medium in the United States Navy during World War II. The ship was transferred to France as L9012, South Vietnam as RVNS Hàn Giang (HQ-401) and Philippines to be cannibalized for spare parts.

== Construction and career ==
LSM-110 was laid down on 7 October 1944 at Brown Shipbuilding Co., Houston, Texas. Launched on 28 October 1944 and commissioned on 25 November 1944.

During World War II, LSM-110 was assigned to the Asiatic-Pacific theater.

LSM-110 was decommissioned on 2 January 1947 and was in service for Naval Reserve training. She was recommissioned on 19 September 1950 amid the Korean War. The ship took part in the U.N. Summer-Fall Offensive from 1 to 31 October 1952, Korean Defense Summer-Fall 1952 from 26 September to 20 December 1952 and the Third Korean Winter from 10 December 1952 to 9 February 1953.

She was loaned to the French on 22 January 1954.

She was struck from the Navy Register.

The ship was commissioned into the French Navy on 28 June 1954 and renamed L9012.

L9012 was then transferred to South Vietnam in October 1955 and commissioned in December, later that year as RVNS Hàn Giang (HQ-401). The ship was used as a hospital ship during the Vietnam War. She was very nearly swamped by hundreds of civilians who swarmed aboard her at Stone Pier during the April 1975 fall of Nha Trang. Several people were trampled to death or drowned after being pushed into the water. The Hàn Giang's captain, feeling the ship begin to list, had to back it away from the pier. The local naval commander refused to allow any more of his ships to dock and risk being lost so ordered his vessels to sail for Cam Ranh.

During the fall of Vietnam, she escaped and interned into the Philippines in May 1975 and later acquired by the Philippine Navy on 17 November 1975 to be used as spare parts.

She was scrapped on 9 June 1976 by Santiago A. Gerrero, Olongapo City.

== Awards ==
LST-110 have earned the following awards:

- American Campaign Medal
- Asiatic-Pacific Campaign Medal
- World War II Victory Medal
- National Defense Service Medal
- Korean Service Medal (3 battle stars)
- United Nations Service Medal
- Republic of Korea War Service Medal

== Sources ==
- United States. Dept. of the Treasury (1962). Treasury Decisions Under the Customs, Internal Revenue, Industrial Alcohol, Narcotic and Other Laws, Volume 97. U.S. Government Printing Office.
- Moore, Capt. John (1984). Jane's Fighting Ships 1984-85. Jane's Information Group. ISBN 978-0710607959.
- Saunders, Stephen (2009). Jane's Fighting Ships 2009-2010. Jane's Information Group. ISBN 978-0710628886.
- Fairplay International Shipping Journal Volume 222. United Kingdom: Fairplay Publishing Limited. 1967.
