= USS Raritan (LSM-540) =

1945 LSM-1-class landing ship medium

History

United States
- Name: USS LSM-540
- Ordered: 1945
- Builder: Brown Shipbuilding, Houston, Texas
- Laid down: 10 May 1945
- Launched: August 1945
- Commissioned: 6 December 1945, as USS LSM-540
- Decommissioned: 29 May 1946
- Recommissioned: 4 November 1957
- Decommissioned: 1 December 1959
- Renamed: USS Raritan (LSM-540), 14 October 1959
- Stricken: 1 January 1960
- Fate: Unknown, presumed scrapped

General characteristics
- Class & type: LSM-1-class landing ship medium
- Displacement: 520 long tons (528 t) light; 743 long tons (755 t) landing; 1,095 long tons (1,113 t) full
- Length: 203 ft 6 in (62.03 m) o/a
- Beam: 34 ft 6 in (10.52 m)
- Draft: Light : 3 ft 6 in (1.07 m) forward; 7 ft 8 in (2.34 m) aft; Full load : 6 ft 4 in (1.93 m) forward; 8 ft 3 in (2.51 m) aft
- Propulsion: 2 × Fairbanks Morse (model 38D81/8X10, reversible with hydraulic clutch) diesels. Direct drive with 1,440 bhp (1,070 kW) each at 720 rpm, twin screws
- Speed: 13.2 knots (24.4 km/h; 15.2 mph) (928 tons displacement)
- Range: 4,900 nmi (9,100 km) at 12 kn (22 km/h; 14 mph) (928 tons displacement)
- Capacity: 5 medium or 3 heavy tanks (150 tons max. payload, beaching); or 6 LVT's, or 9 DUKW's
- Troops: 2 officers, 46 enlisted
- Complement: 5 officers, 54 enlisted
- Armament: 2 × 40 mm AA guns; 4 × 20 mm AA guns
- Armor: 10-lb. STS splinter shield to gun mounts, pilot house and conning station

The third USS Raritan (LSM-540) was a LSM-1-class landing ship medium in the United States Navy following World War II. She was named for a river in New Jersey.

== Service history ==
Raritan was laid down on 10 May 1945 at Brown Shipbuilding Company, Houston, Texas, launched in August 1945, commissioned as USS LSM-540 on 6 December 1945. She was decommissioned on 29 May 1946, at Green Cove Springs, Florida and laid up in the Atlantic Reserve Fleet, Florida Group, Green Cove Springs.

Recommissioned on 4 November 1957, she was renamed USS Raritan (LSM-540) on 14 October 1959, then decommissioned on 1 December 1959 at Norfolk, Virginia, and struck from the Naval Vessel Register on 1 January 1960.
