= USS LSM-20 =

1944 LSM-1-class landing ship medium

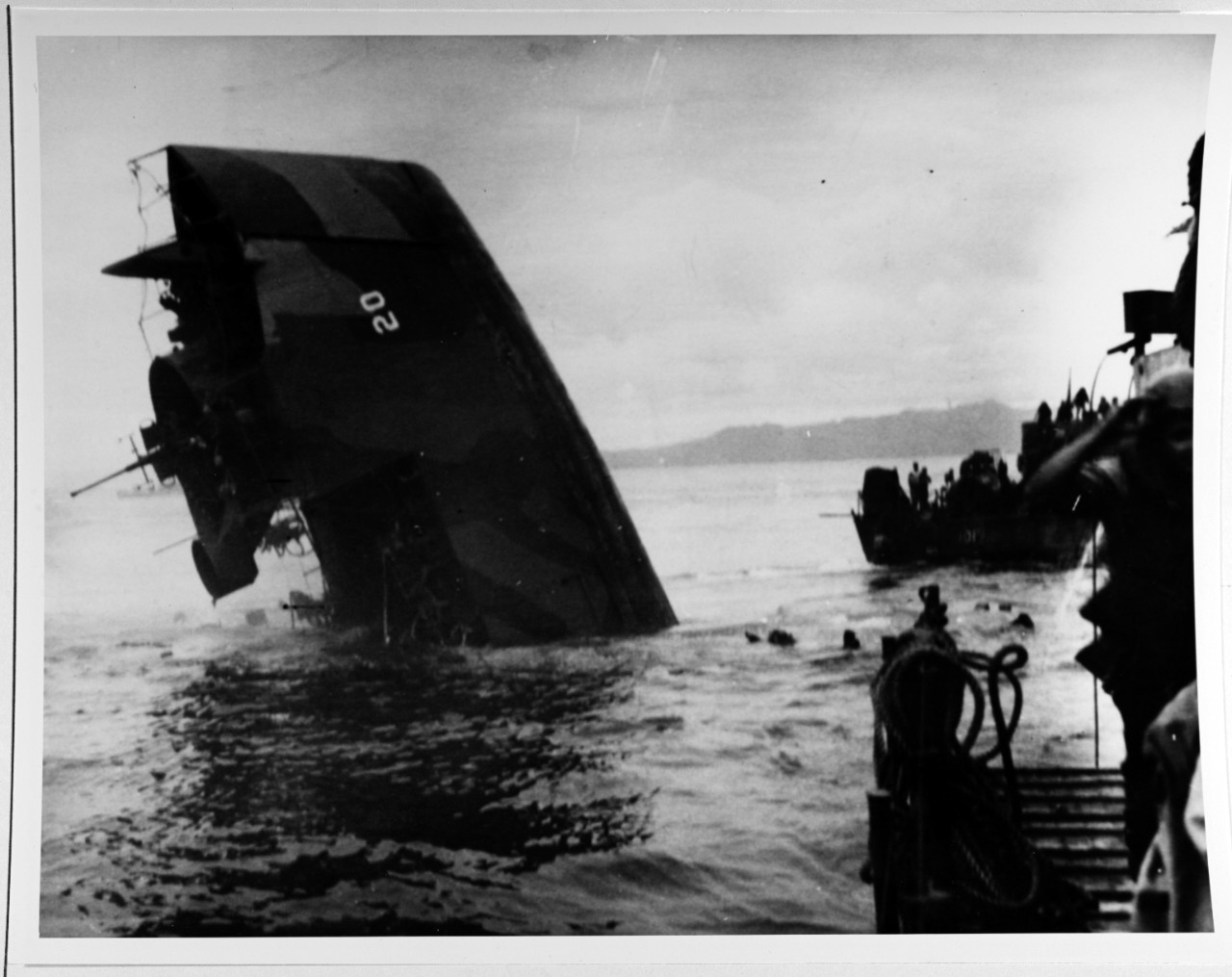
- USS LSM-20 sinking on 5 December 1944

History

United States
- Name: USS LSM-20
- Ordered: 15 September 1943
- Builder: Brown Shipbuilding Co., Houston, Texas
- Laid down: 24 April 1944
- Launched: 14 May 1944
- Commissioned: 16 June 1944
- Stricken: 20 January 1945
- Honors and awards: 1 battle star
- Fate: Sunk 5 December 1944

General characteristics
- Class & type: LSM-1-class landing ship medium
- Displacement: 520 long tons (530 t) (light); 743 long tons (755 t) (landing); 1,095 long tons (1,113 t) (fully loaded)
- Length: 203 ft 6 in (62.03 m)
- Beam: 34 ft 6 in (10.52 m)
- Draft: light, 3 ft 6 in (1.07 m) forward, 7 ft 8 in (2.34 m) aft; fully loaded, 6 ft 4 in (1.93 m) forward, 8 ft 3 in (2.51 m) aft
- Speed: 13.2 knots (24.4 km/h; 15.2 mph) max.

USS LSM-20 was a LSM-1-class landing ship medium of the United States Navy, commissioned at Brown Shipyards in Houston, Texas, on 16 June 1944. During WWII, she operated in the Pacific. On 5 December 1944, the vessel sunk after she was hit by a Japanese kamikaze in the Surigao Strait in the Philippines. Five sailors were killed and another nine were wounded.
