= Leigh Bishop =

Diver known for shipwreck exploration and photography

Leigh Bishop (born 17 April 1968) is an explorer and deep sea diver known for his deep shipwreck exploration and still underwater photography.

== Background ==
Born in Northamptonshire, England in 1968, he began diving at the age of twenty-one and established himself on the technical diving scene during its formative years. Utilizing mixed gas to explore deep wrecks around the British Isles since the beginning of the 1990s, his 1997 expedition to search for the lost King Edward VII-class battleship off North Scotland became the first of its kind to explore shipwrecks beyond 100 m (330 ft) depths in European waters. With little material available on the subject of deep 35 mm stills he took to photography specifically for the HMHS Britannic 1998 expedition.

His photographs have been published in magazines and national newspapers. He is known mostly for his ambient-light monochrome images of shipwrecks, which use natural light and long time exposures using a tripod to capture images of shipwrecks that are impossible to light using man-made lighting effects.

Bishop has worked with government departments in finding shipwrecks: for instance with the UK Customs & Excise Receiver of Wreck, Bishop worked with various diving teams to legally recover artefacts from deep shipwrecks that went on display in various maritime museums.

He has published hundreds of periodicals and photographs on the subject of shipwrecks globally and lectured on the subject around the world. He has researched into London archives, which led him to the identification of many unknown shipwrecks around the British Isles. During the 1990s Bishop and his dive partner Chris Hutchison are said to have explored more than 400 virgin shipwrecks.

Bishop is a professional HSE qualified diver and has worked on consultancy for several television documentaries and has been involved in the commissioning of documentaries shown on several major network channels. He has also worked as an underwater cameraman where his film footage has been cut into underwater television documentaries for National Geographic, History Channel, Discovery Channel, BBC and other major UK networks. To overcome depth and gas logistics of deep exploration he used closed circuit technology (rebreathers) from the early days of technical diving to explore deep shipwrecks. His experience with various rebreather systems led him to become a development diver for certain rebreather companies.

In 2008 he co founded EUROTEK the technical and advanced diving conference held bi-annually in Birmingham, England, a conference that attracts technical divers, explorers, professors and scientists from around the world.

During several expeditions to the RMS Lusitania he accumulated almost ten hours physically on the wreck, building the most extensive collection of images of the wreck to date. He also photographed the liner SS Transylvania, sunk in 135 m/445 ft in the north Atlantic. During 2001 along with fellow members of the deep wreck diving team 'Starfish Enterprise' he took the first images of the lost gold treasure shipwreck the SS Egypt, sunk in deep water off the edge of Biscay (Western Atlantic). Also in 2001 he made the discovery of Captain Kurt Carlsen's shipwreck Flying Enterprise, lost in 1952. He went on to be involved as a photographer in high profile expeditions, such as HMHS Britannic (Titanic's sister ship) in 1998, 2003, 2006, 2009 and 2016.

== Publishing ==
Bishop has published articles, features and photographs in many magazines globally as well as books and major newspapers published in America and England. He has written over 200 full feature articles and his creative underwater imagery has been used in many advertising campaigns for the promotion of diving manufacturers' equipment and popular publications. He has contributed to all of the UK's diving magazines, although he specifically contributes to the UK's DIVER magazine and the US-based Wreck Diving magazine. Underwater images of shipwrecks and divers taken by Bishop have appeared on covers of various magazines.

== Public presentations ==
Bishop has made many public presentations about shipwreck exploration, including lectures at the Royal Geographical Society in London, the Australian technical diving conference in Sydney, and lectures at the National Exhibition Centre and London Arena.

He has spoken at the NEC DIVE show on numerous occasions, conferences in Scotland and Wales, Warwick University, Imperial College London, Birmingham University and at many UK dive clubs. In February 2003 he was invited to speak at the International Shipwreck Conference at Plymouth University and later that year made his first appearance as a speaker at the European photographic seminar 'Visions in the Sea' at King's College London.

== Expeditions and projects ==
- HMS Hampshire (1995)
- HMS Pheasant (1996)
- HMS King Edward VII (1997)
- HMS Affray (1998)
- HMHS Britannic (1998, 2003, 2006, 2009, 2016)
- HMS M1 (1999)
- RMS Lusitania (1999, 2000 & 2001)
- SS Tuscania (2001)
- RMS Egypt (2001 & 2002)
- Flying Enterprise (2001 & 2002)
- Northern Atlantic deep wreck expedition (2001 & 2002)
- HMS Charybdis & HMS Limbourne (2002)
- RMS Titanic (2003)
- MV Wilhelm Gustloff (2003)
- Black Sea expedition (2004)
- SS Transylvania (2004)
- RMS Andania (2004)
- HMS Vandal (2005)
- RMS Niagara (2007)
- Exploration of the deep wrecks of Truk Lagoon (2008, 2009, 2010)
- Cocklebiddy Cave diving expedition, Nullarbor Plain desert Australia (2009)
- Mars Expedition (2014)
