= MV Aorangi =

New Zealand transpacific ocean liner

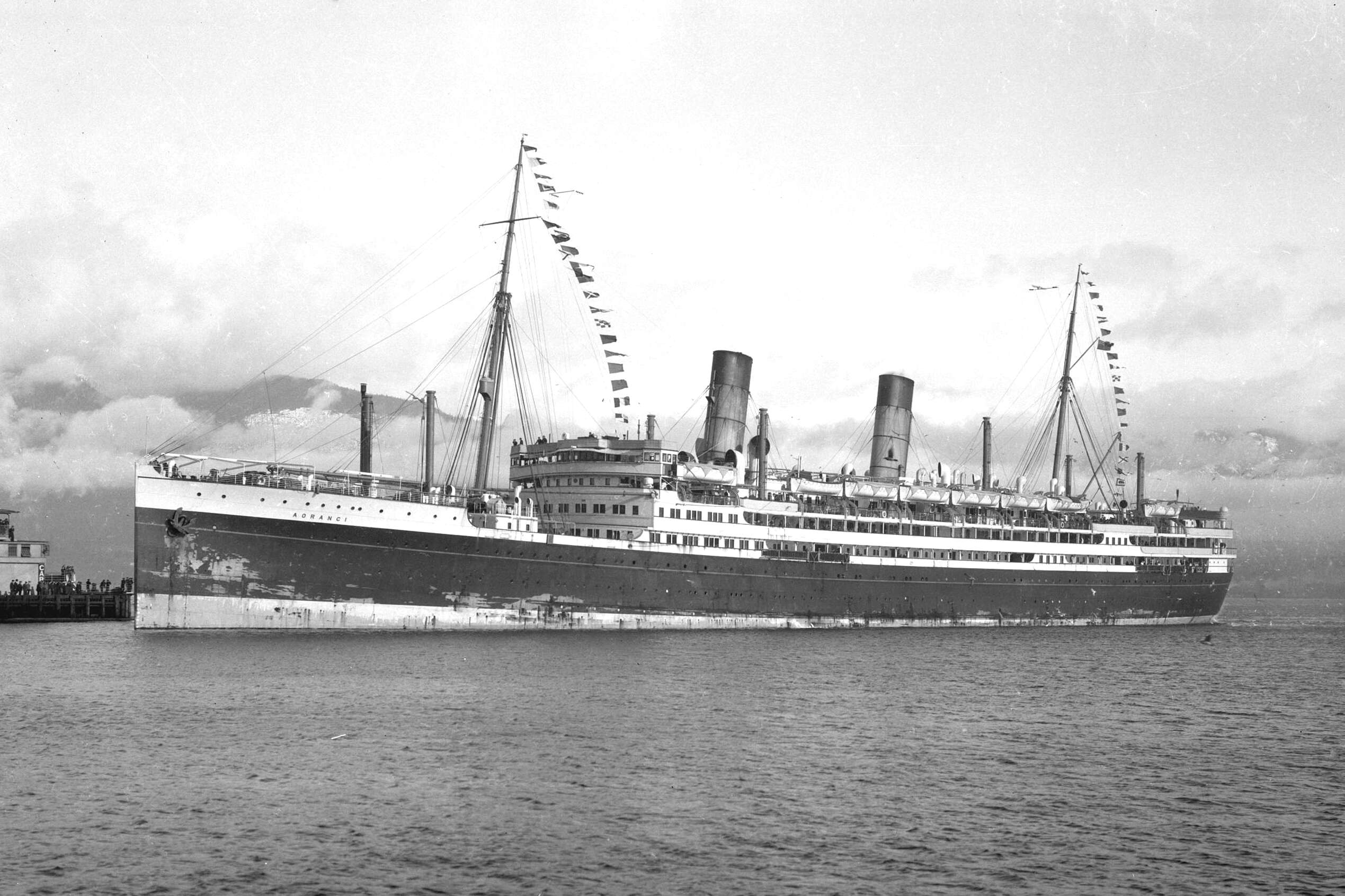
- Aorangi

History

United Kingdom
- Name: Aorangi
- Namesake: Aoraki / Mount Cook
- Owner: 1925: Union Steam Ship Co of NZ; 1931: Canadian-Australasian Line
- Operator: 1925: Union Steam Ship Co of NZ; 1931: Canadian-Australasian Line
- Port of registry: London
- Route: Sydney – Auckland – Suva – Honolulu – Vancouver
- Builder: Fairfield Shipbuilding & Engineering Co
- Yard number: 603
- Launched: 17 June 1924
- Completed: 16 December 1924
- Maiden voyage: 2 January 1925
- Refit: 1946–48 in Sydney
- Identification: UK official number 148515; Code letters KRVH (until 1933); Call sign GDVB (1934 onward)
- Fate: Scrapped 1953

General characteristics
- Type: Ocean liner
- Tonnage: 17,491 GRT, 10,733 NRT
- Length: 580.1 ft (176.8 m)
- Beam: 72.2 ft (22.0 m)
- Draught: 27 ft 10 in (8.48 m)
- Depth: 43.4 ft (13.2 m)
- Installed power: 9,560 kW (12,820 hp)
- Propulsion: 4 × Sulzer two-stroke diesel engines; 4 × screws
- Speed: 17 knots (31 km/h)
- Capacity: as built: 440 1st class; 300 2nd class; 230 3rd class; 1948: 212 1st class; 170 cabin class; 104 3rd class; 94,960 cu ft (2,689 m^{3}) refrigerated cargo
- Sensors & processing systems: by 1930: submarine signalling; wireless direction finding; by 1934: gyrocompass

MV Aorangi was a transpacific ocean liner and refrigerated cargo ship. She was launched in 1924 in Scotland and scrapped in 1953. Her regular route was between Sydney and Vancouver via Auckland, Suva and Honolulu.

Aorangi was owned firstly by the Union Steam Ship Company of New Zealand (popularly known as the "Union Company"), and later by the Canadian-Australasian Line, which was jointly owned by the Union Company and Canadian Pacific. Like many Union Company ships, she was registered in London in the United Kingdom.

Aorangi was a troop ship and depot ship in the Second World War.

When new, Aorangi was both the largest and the swiftest motor ship in the World. She was also the largest and swiftest ship in the Union Company fleet.

== Background ==
Since the first decade of the 20th century the Union Company had operated the Sydney – Vancouver mail ship route. In 1913 the Union Company introduced a new liner on the route, RMS Niagara. She was faster and far larger than any other ship in the company's fleet, and was an instant success. The company wanted to maintain a scheduled four-weekly service with just two ships. For this it wanted another ship as large and swift as Niagara.

At the end of 1913 the Union Company ordered a sister ship for Niagara from the Fairfield Shipbuilding and Engineering Company in Govan, Glasgow. She was 30 ft (9 m) longer than Niagara, and a greater tonnage. She was a turbine steamship, launched on 30 June 1915 as Aotearoa, the Māori name for New Zealand.

The Admiralty requisitioned Aotearoa and renamed her HMS Avenger. She was completed on 14 December 1915 as an armed merchant cruiser. A U-boat sank her by torpedo in 1917.

In 1920 the Union Company revived its plan for a new liner to share the transpacific route with Niagara. That June it announced that the new ship would be propelled by reduction-geared turbines like HMS Avenger, and capable of 18 knots (33 km/h) like Niagara. But the new ship would be considerably larger: 18,000 GRT and more than 600 feet (180 m) long.

However, in the 1920s marine diesel engines advanced rapidly in size and power. This led the Union Company to change its plans and order a motor ship.

== Building ==
Fairfield Shipbuilding and Engineering Company built Aorangi in Govan. On 17 June 1924 Mrs Holdsworth, wife of the Union Company's managing director Charles Holdsworth, launched her. The ship was completed on 16 December. She was 580.1 ft (176.8 m) long, her beam was 72.2 ft (22.0 m) and her tonnages were 17,491 GRT and 10,733 NRT. She had berths for 440 first class, 300 second class and 230 third class passengers, and her holds had refrigerated space for 94,960 cu ft (2,689 m^{3}) of cargo.

Aorangi was propelled by four screws, each driven by a Fairfield-Sulzer ST70 single-acting two-stroke diesel engine. Between them her four engines were rated at 9,560 kW (12,820 hp). On her sea trials she achieved 18.24 knots (33.78 km/h). Her regular service speed was 17 knots (31 km/h).

When new, Aorangi was both the largest and the swiftest motor ship in the World. She also supplanted Niagara as the largest and swiftest ship in the Union Company fleet.

== Service ==
After extensive sea trials Aorangi sailed from the Clyde to Southampton, where on 2 January 1925 she began her maiden voyage to Vancouver via the Panama Canal and Los Angeles. On 6 February she began regular service between Vancouver and Sydney.

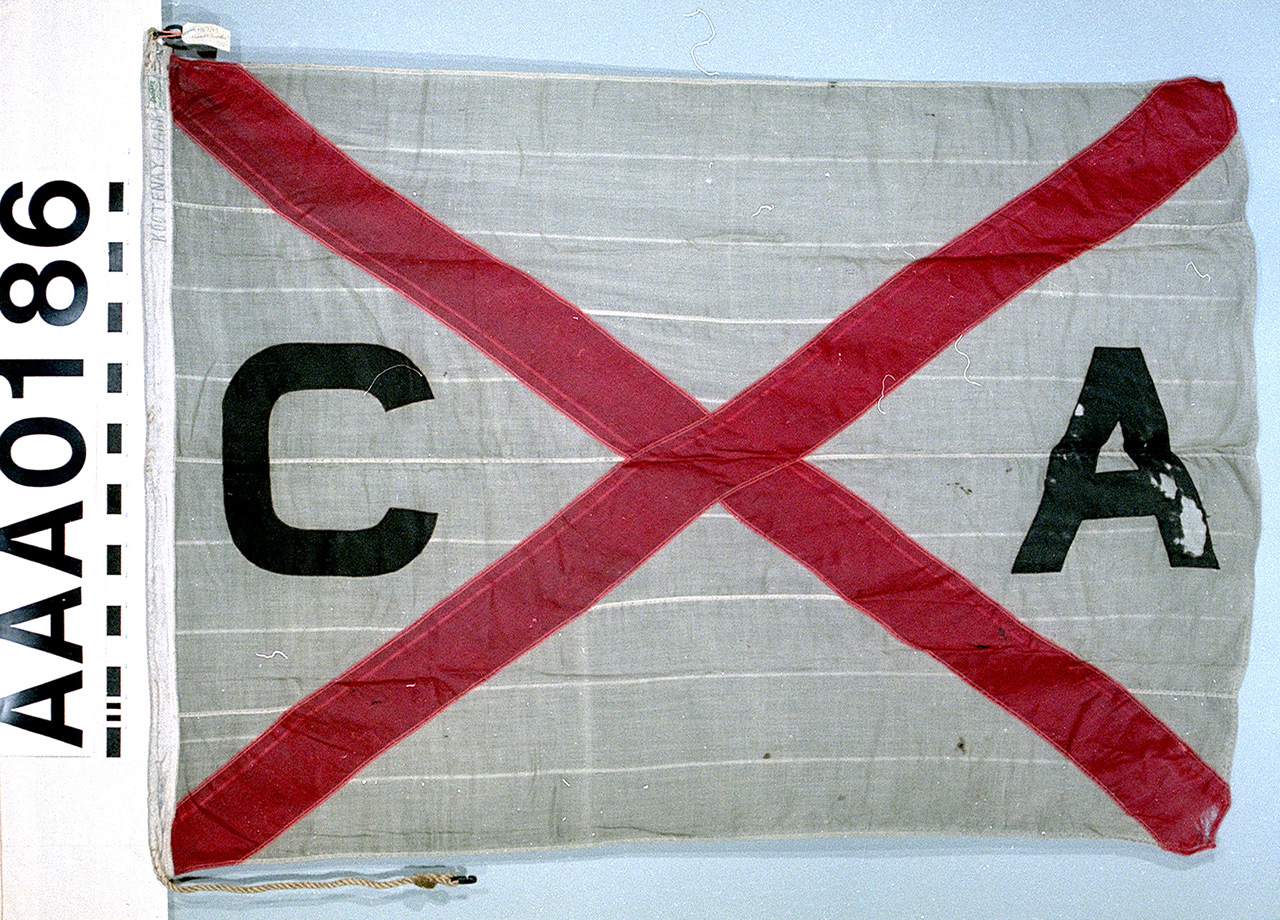
Canadian-Australasian Line house flag

In 1931 the Union Company anticipated competition from Matson Line of the US, which had ordered two new liners, Mariposa and Monterey, to run between the West Coast of the United States and Australia via Hawaii, Fiji and New Zealand. They would be swifter than Niagara and Aorangi, and the Federal government of the United States subsidised US ships US$10 per mile to carry mail, which gave them a competitive advantage over UK and Empire ships. In response the Union Company and Canadian Pacific created a new jointly owned subsidiary, Canadian-Australasian Line, to which the Union Company transferred Niagara and Aorangi.

In 1934 the wireless call sign GDVB superseded Aorangi's code letters KRVH. Also by 1934 a gyrocompass was added to her navigational equipment.

In June 1936 the UK government commissioned the Imperial Shipping Committee to examine merchant shipping in the Pacific, including problems caused by subsidised US competition. Canadian Pacific's Chairman, Sir Edward Beatty, sought support from the governments of the UK, Canada, Australia, New Zealand and Fiji to improve Canadian-Australasian's trans-pacific service. He proposed a pair of 22,000 GRT, 22-knot (41 km/h) liners at a cost of £2.5 million if the governments would subsidise the service. P&O, which owned the Union Company, supported the proposal. The Imperial Shipping Committee recognised the problem but proposed no solution.

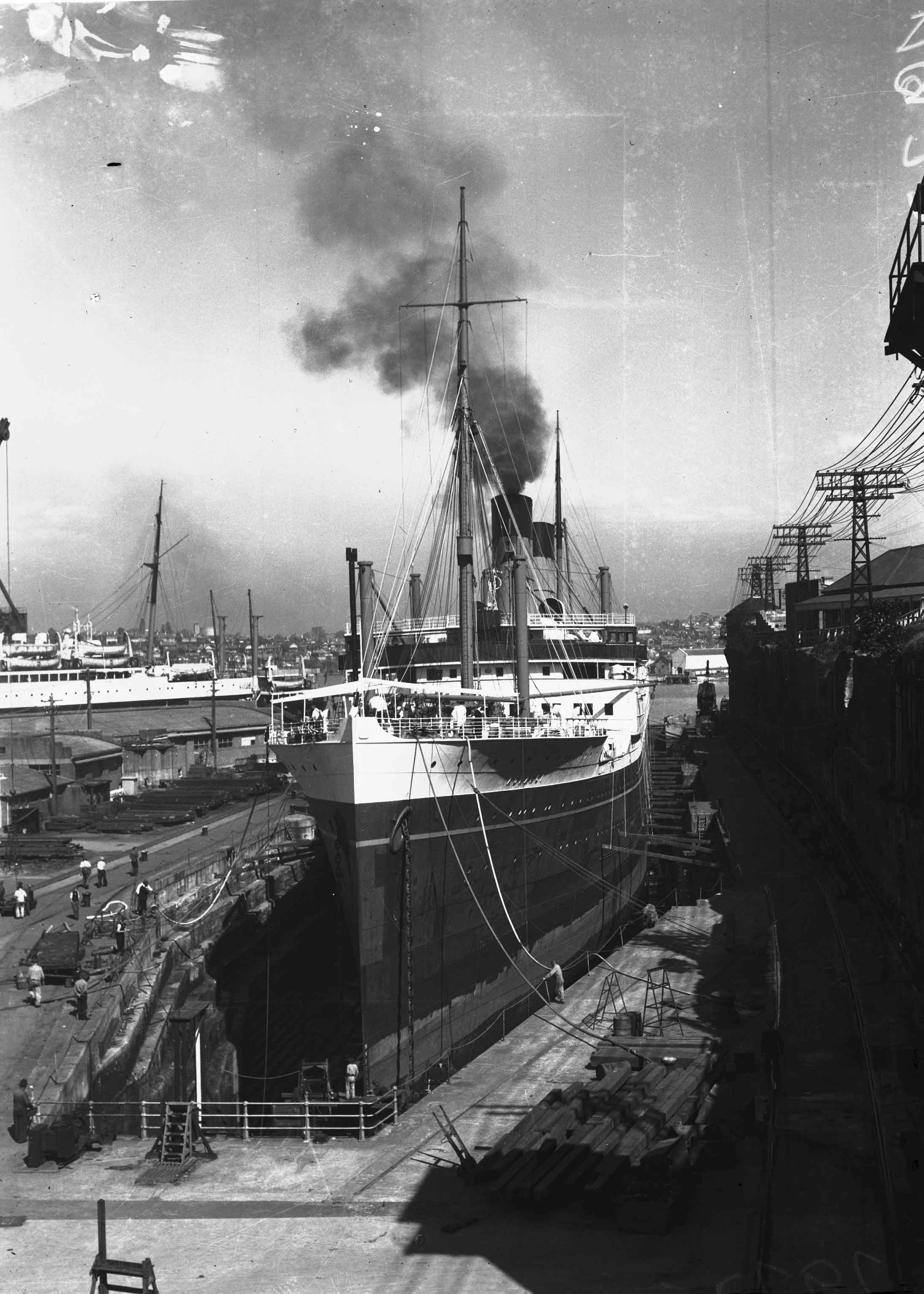
Aorangi in dry dock in Sydney

In May and June 1937 an Imperial Conference considered matters including shipping, which faced increasing Japanese competition as well as subsidised competition from US ships. Beatty reiterated his proposal for new 22,000 GRT liners to replace Niagara and Aorangi. Hopes were raised but no agreement was reached.

On 1 September 1939 the Second World War began. That October Canadian-Australasian Line introduced a 33 percent war surcharge on passenger fares. In January 1940 this was reduced to 15 percent to encourage travel between Australia and New Zealand.

By October 1940 Aorangi was a troop ship, and in 1941 the UK Ministry of War Transport requisitioned her. As such she saw service in the Pacific, the Indian Ocean, the Atlantic Ocean and the Mediterranean and Middle East theatre.

From 12 November 1941 to 18 December 1941, the Aorangi was in “Winston Special” Convoy WS12Z. WS12Z convoy sailed just before midnight of November 12 (into the 13th). Convoy WS12Z arrived at Freetown, Sierra Leone on 25 November 1941. The convoy left Freetown on 28 November 1941. The convoy arrived at Durban, South Africa on 18 December 1941. Because of the Japanese attacks 8 December 1941, there was a reorganization of the ships, their loads and destinations in Durban.

From 24 December 1941 to 30 December 1941, Aorangi was in convoy WS12Z-M (Malaya). On 24 December 1941, convoys WS12Z-A (Aden), WS12Z-B (Bombay) and WS12Z-M (Malaya) depart Durban. The ships in Convoy WS12Z-M, headed to reinforce Singapore, are P&O's SS Narkunda, MV Aorangi, P&O's MV Sussex and MS Abbekerk.

From 30 December 1941 to 13 January 1942, Aorangi was in convoy DM 1. At 1000 on 30 December 1941, about 370 miles east of Mombasa, convoy WS12ZM (Malaya) detaches from convoys WS12ZA (Aden) and WS12ZB (Bombay), and with USS Mount Vernon and escort HMS Emerald form convoy DM 1 (Durban Malaya). Convoy DM 1 reaches ‘Port T’ – Addu Atoll in the Maldives at 1000 on 4 January 1942. On 11 January 1942, the convoy passes through the Sunda Strait. On 12 January 1942, the convoy passes through the Bangka Strait. On 13 January 1942, convoy DM 1 arrives in Singapore

In the Allied invasion of Normandy, she was a depot ship. The MoWT returned Aorangi to her owners in May 1946.

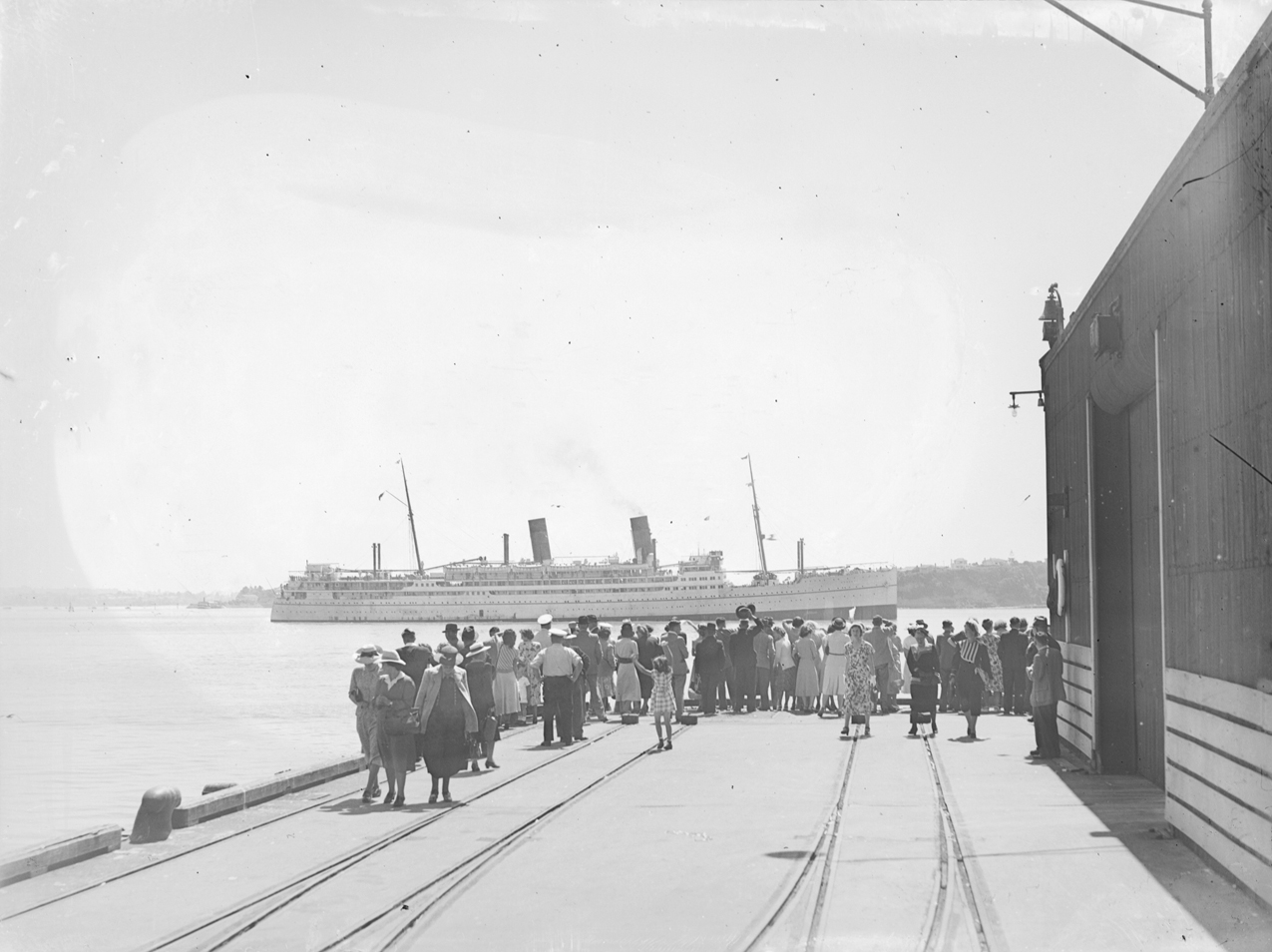
Aorangi after her post-war refit, with her hull repainted white

Canadian-Australasian Line had Aorangi refitted in Sydney. The cost of £1.4 million was met by the UK Government. Her passenger accommodation was reduced to create better quarters for her crew. In August 1948 she returned to service with berths for 212 first class, 170 cabin class and 104 third class passengers. Her hull was repainted white, with a green waistline and green boot-topping.

In 1940 a German mine had sunk Niagara. She was not replaced, so Aorangi returned to service alone, providing a transpacific service every two months. Matson Line did not resume its transpacific service after the war. Despite the lack of competition Aorangi now made a loss on each voyage, because there was a shortage of cargo.

Canadian-Australasian Line sought a subsidy from the Australian, New Zealand and Canadian governments to continue the service. None was forthcoming, so in 1951 the company laid Aorangi up. The governments responded with a $250,000 subsidy for one year, with Canada paying two thirds of the total.

Aorangi returned to service, and the governments subsidised her for a second year. But by then she was reaching the end of her seaworthy life, so she was withdrawn in 1953.

Aorangi completed her last transpacific voyage when she reached Sydney on 9 June 1953. She was stripped of furnishings in Sydney and on 18 June left for Scotland. On 25 July she reached Dalmuir on the River Clyde to be scrapped by WH Arnott, Young and Co.

== Bibliography ==
- Harnack, Edwin P (1930) [1903]. All About Ships & Shipping (3rd ed.). London: Faber and Faber.
- Wilson, RM (1956). The Big Ships. London: Cassell & Co.
