= Kurt Carlsen =

Danish-born sea-captain (1914-1989)

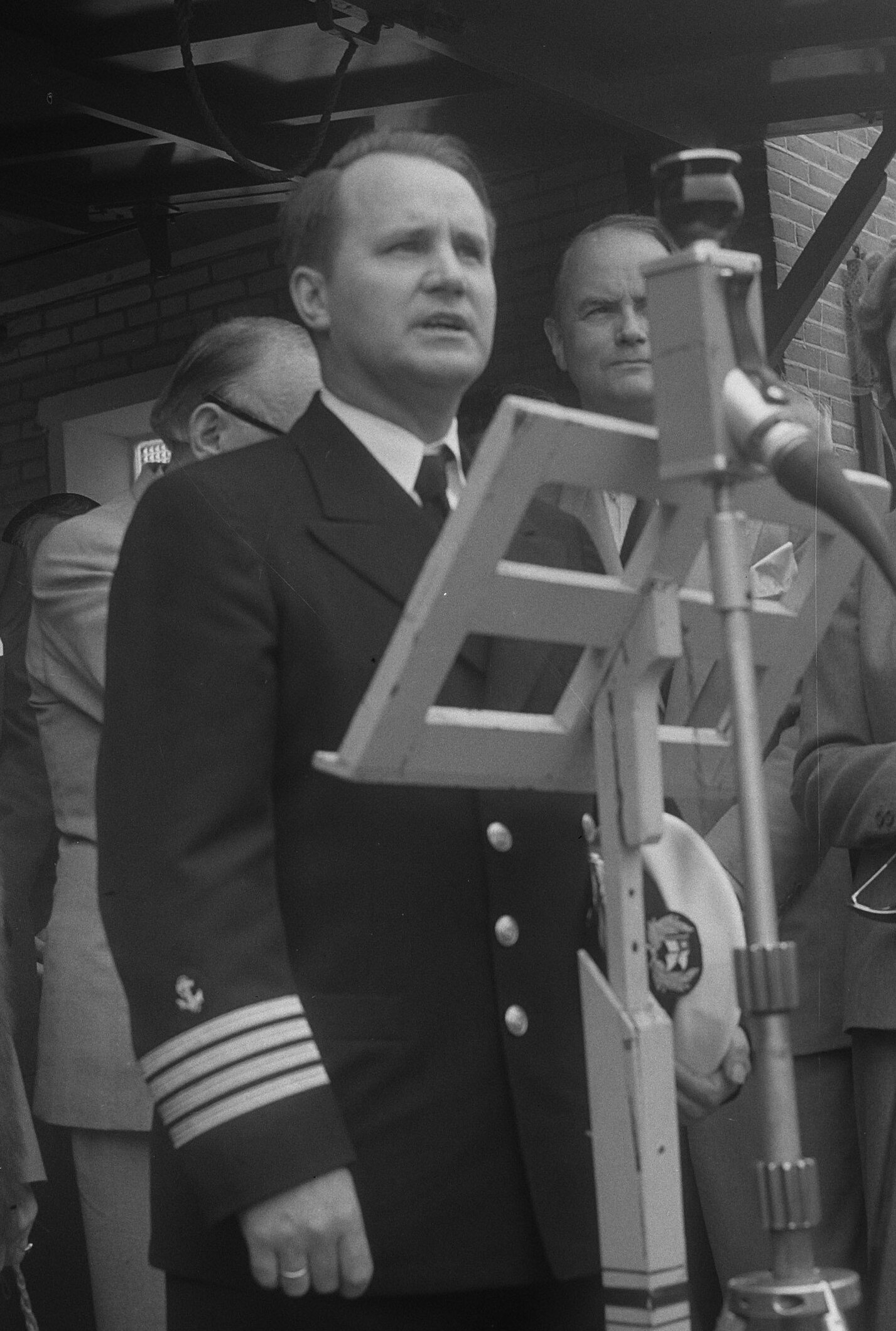
Kurt Carlsen (1953)

(Henrik) Kurt Carlsen (20 February 1914 – 7 October 1989) was a Danish-born sea-captain who became world-famous in January 1952 when he stayed on his sinking freighter, the Flying Enterprise, for 13 days. It eventually sank less than 60 kilometres (37 mi) from safe harbour at Falmouth, Cornwall in England, minutes after the Captain was forced to abandon ship. The endeavour was reported around the world, and Carlsen received a ticker-tape parade in New York City on January 17, 1952. A few months later Carlsen took command of the Flying Enterprise II, passing up lucrative offers from Hollywood.

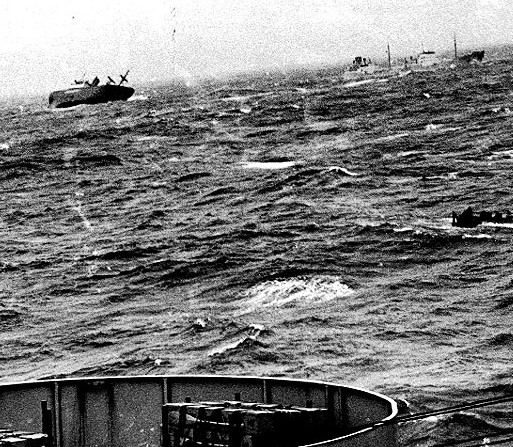
The listing Flying Enterprise (upper left) as seen from the USNS General A.W. Greely (T-AP-141), c. December 29, 1951

It is now believed that the Flying Enterprise was hit not once but twice by a rogue wave thereby eventually sinking the freighter.

Carlsen became a seaman at age 14 and master of his first ship at 22, in the service of the Danish-American company American Export-Isbrandtsen Lines. He was an amateur radio operator with the US callsign W2ZXM.

Carlsen, and his ordeal aboard the Flying Enterprise, is the subject of the book Simple Courage: a True Story of Peril on the Sea by Frank Delaney.

Carlsen received the Merchant Marine Distinguished Service Award, authorized by a special act of Congress. On January 10, 2012, the Captain Carlsen Park in Sewaren, Woodbridge Township, New Jersey was rededicated to the heroic efforts of Captain Carlsen. A monument was installed at the park which was donated by Shipco Transport Inc. a New Jersey transportation services company. A contingent of Danish visitors were present along with the Captain Carlsen's daughters.
