= USS LSM-397 =

1945 LSM-1-class landing ship medium

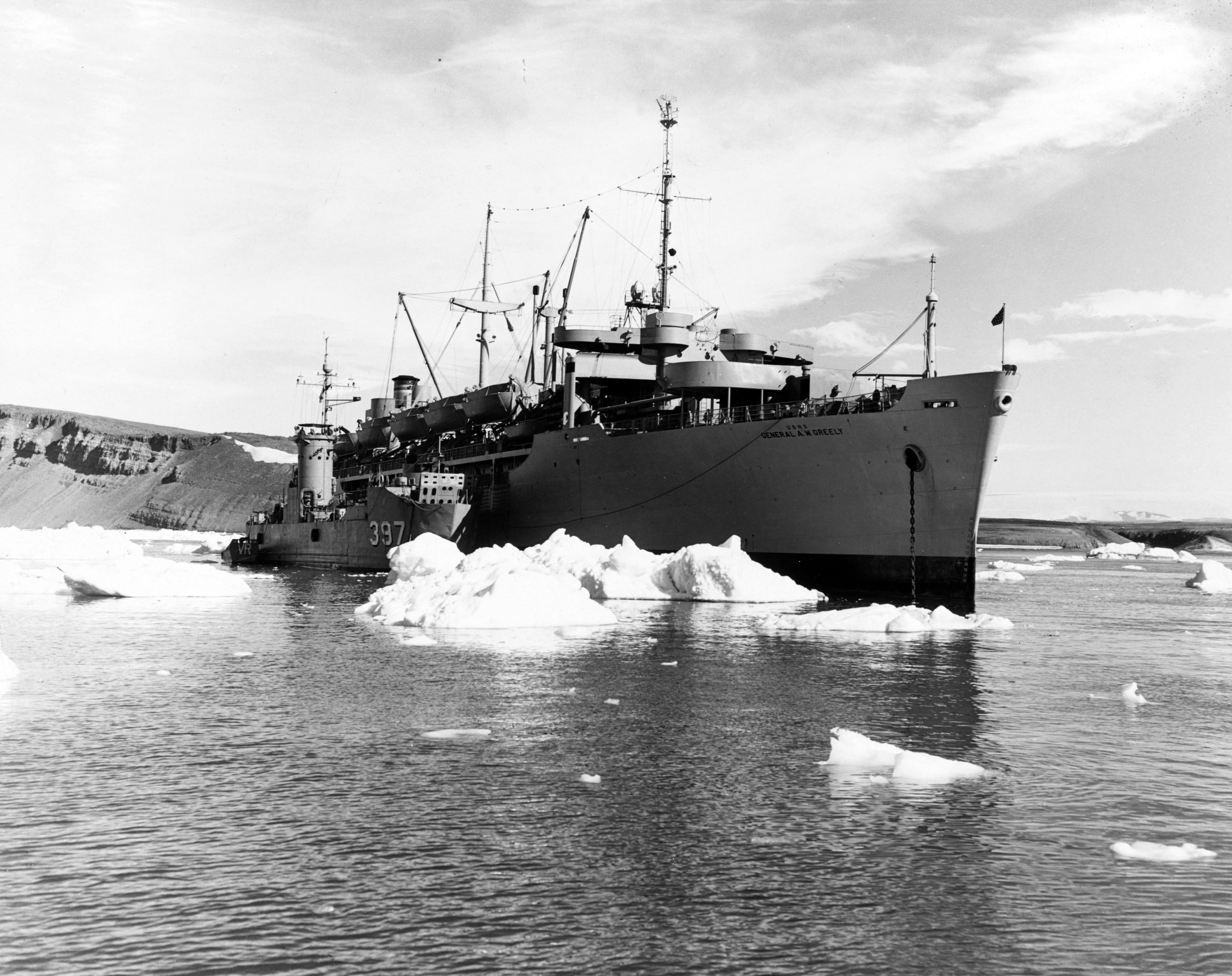
- LSM-397 alongside the General A. W. Greely (AP-141) at Thule, Greenland, during Operation "Blue Jay", 19 July 1951

History

United States
- Name: LSM-397
- Ordered: 1944
- Builder: Charleston Navy Yard, South Carolina
- Laid down: 15 December 1944
- Launched: 6 January 1945
- Commissioned: 30 July 1945
- Decommissioned: 24 February 1958
- Fate: Sold, November 1958

General characteristics
- Class & type: LSM-1 Class Landing Ship Medium
- Displacement: 520 long tons (528 t) light; 742 long tons (754 t) landing; 1,095 long tons (1,113 t) full load
- Length: 203 ft 6 in (62.03 m) o/a
- Beam: 34 ft 6 in (10.52 m)
- Draft: Light : 3 ft 6 in (1.07 m) fwd, 7 ft 8 in (2.34 m) aft; Full load : 6 ft 4 in (1.93 m) fwd, 8 ft 3 in (2.51 m) aft
- Propulsion: 2 × General Motors 1,440 bhp (1,074 kW) diesel engines, direct drive, twin screws
- Speed: 13.2 knots (24.4 km/h; 15.2 mph)
- Range: 4,900 nmi (9,100 km) at 12 kn (22 km/h; 14 mph)
- Capacity: 5 medium or 3 heavy tanks (150 tons max. payload, beaching); or 6 LVTs or 9 DUKWs; 54 troops
- Complement: 5 officers, 54 enlisted
- Armament: 1 × single 40 mm AA gun; 4 × single 20 mm AA guns

USS LSM-397 was a 520-ton (empty) Landing Ship Medium (LSM) of the United States Navy. Built at Charleston Navy Yard, South Carolina, and commissioned in July 1945, she served with the U.S. Atlantic Fleet for her entire Navy career, initially with the Amphibious Force. She was reassigned to the Service Force in May 1954. LSM-397 was decommissioned in February 1958, and was sold in May 1958.

== Bibliography ==
- Silverstone, Paul H. (2008). The Navy of World War II, 1922-1947. The U.S. Navy Warship Series. New York: Routledge. ISBN 978-0-415-97898-9.
