= RMS Niagara =

New Zealand passenger vessel (1912–1940)

Coordinates: 35°51′50″S 174°56′38″E

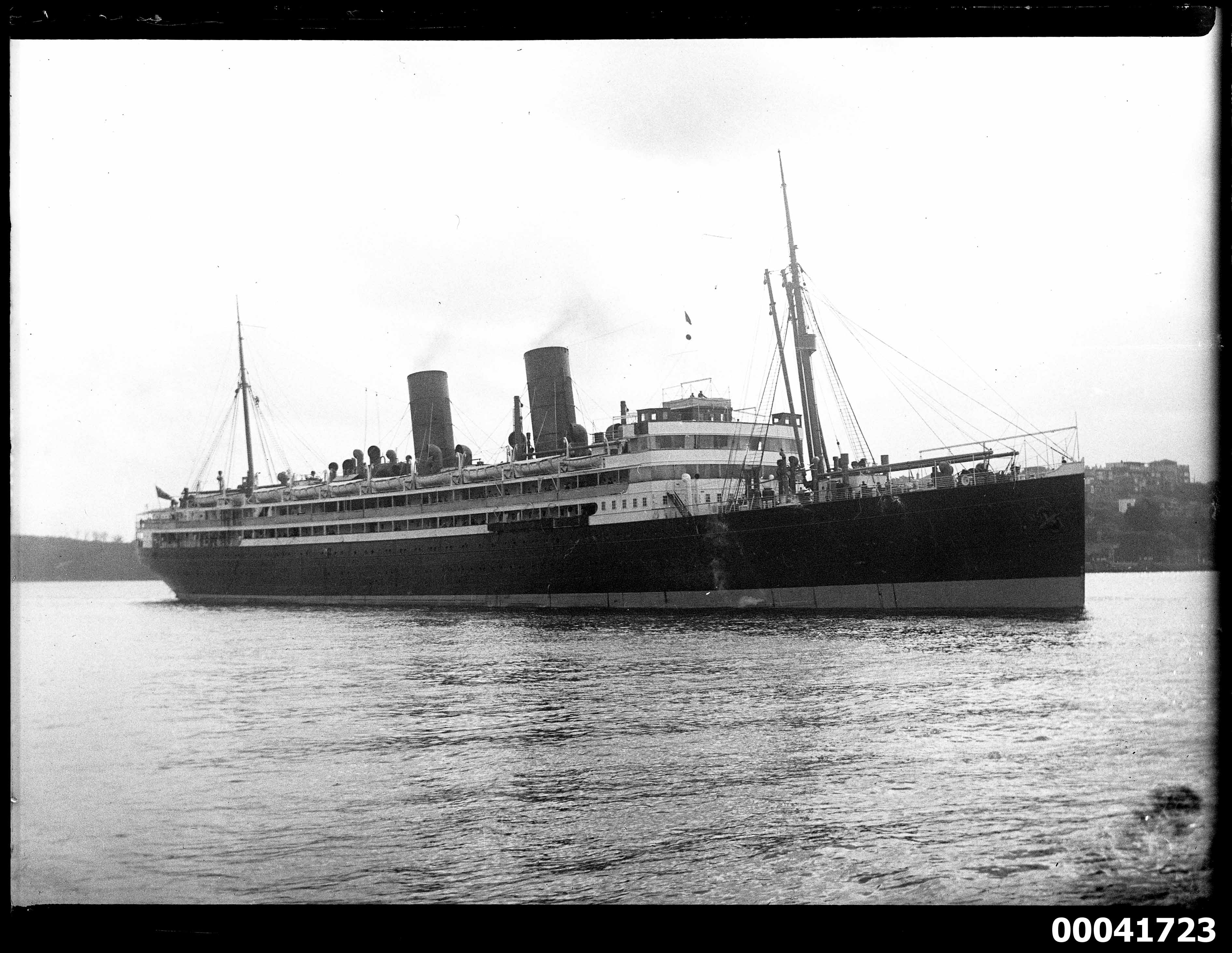
- RMS Niagara in Sydney in 1924

History

United Kingdom
- Name: Niagara
- Namesake: either Niagara River or Niagara Falls
- Owner: 1913: Union Company; 1931: Canadian-Australasian Line
- Operator: 1913: Union Company; 1931: Canadian-Australasian Line
- Port of registry: London
- Route: Sydney – Auckland – Suva – Honolulu – Vancouver
- Builder: John Brown & Company, Clydebank
- Yard number: 415
- Launched: 17 August 1912
- Completed: March 1913
- Identification: UK official number 135193; Code letters JBSG (until 1933); Call sign GBE (until 1933); Call sign GNXP (from 1934)
- Nickname(s): "The Queen of the Pacific"
- Fate: Sunk by a mine, 19 June 1940

General characteristics
- Type: Ocean liner
- Tonnage: 13,415 GRT, 7,582 NRT
- Length: 524.7 ft (159.9 m)
- Beam: 66.3 ft (20.2 m)
- Draught: 28 ft 1 in (8.56 m)
- Depth: 34.5 ft (10.5 m)
- Decks: 3
- Propulsion: 2 × triple-expansion steam engines; 1 × low-pressure steam turbine; 3 × screws
- Speed: 18 knots (33 km/h)
- Capacity: 281 first class; 210 second class; 176 third class; 1928: 81,560 cubic feet (2,310 m^{3}) refrigerated cargo
- Notes: sister ship: HMS Avenger

RMS Niagara was a transpacific steam ocean liner, Royal Mail Ship and refrigerated cargo ship. She was launched in 1912 in Scotland and sunk in 1940 by a mine off the coast of New Zealand.

Her regular route was between Sydney and Vancouver via Auckland, Suva and Honolulu. In her 27-year career she made 162 round trips between Australia, New Zealand and Canada and sailed nearly 2,500,000 nautical miles (4,600,000 km).

Niagara was owned firstly by the Union Company, and later by the Canadian-Australasian Line, which was jointly owned by the Union Company and Canadian Pacific. Like many Union Company ships, she was registered in London in the United Kingdom.

Niagara was built to burn either coal or oil. She was the first oil-burning steamship to be certified by the Board of Trade to carry passengers. When new, Niagara was the largest merchant ship yet owned by a New Zealand company. In 1914 and 1915 she set a number of speed records for crossing the Tasman Sea.

In 1918 Niagara was instrumental in the spread of Spanish flu to New Zealand. When she was sunk in 1940, Niagara was carrying about 8 1/2 tons of gold bars. Divers recovered 555 bars in 1941, and another 30 in 1953, but five gold bars remain unaccounted for.

Niagara was bunkered with oil when she sank. Heavy fuel oil has leaked from her bunker tanks ever since, and has caused some environmental damage in and around Hauraki Gulf. Some oil remains in her wreck, and the scale of environmental threat it may pose continues to be debated.

== Building ==
John Brown & Company built Niagara in Clydebank, Glasgow. Laura Borden, wife of Canadian Prime Minister Robert Borden, launched her on 17 August 1912. Niagara was completed in March 1913. She was 524.7 ft (159.9 m) long, her beam was 66.3 ft (20.2 m) and her tonnages were 13,415 GRT and 7,582 NRT.

Some of Niagara's holds were refrigerated for perishable cargo. When she was new, her number one (forward) hold was not refrigerated.

When new, Niagara was the largest ship in the Union Company's fleet and the largest ship owned by a New Zealand company.

Before she was launched, Niagara was nicknamed "The Titanic of the Pacific". After the Titanic sank in April 1912 this was changed to "The Queen of the Pacific".

=== Propulsion ===
Niagara had three screws. Her port and starboard screws were each driven by a four-cylinder triple-expansion steam engine. Exhaust steam from the low-pressure cylinder of each of these engines powered a Parsons low-pressure steam turbine that drove her middle screw.

The combination of three screws, two piston engines and one low-pressure turbine had been pioneered in the New Zealand Shipping Company's refrigerated cargo liner Otaki, launched in 1908. The same company then ordered a passenger liner with a similar combination, Rotorua, which was launched in 1910. The giant Olympic-class ocean liners and several other passenger liners had also been built with similar "combination machinery". It offered better fuel economy and speed than propulsion purely by piston engines, and more flexibility than pure turbine propulsion.

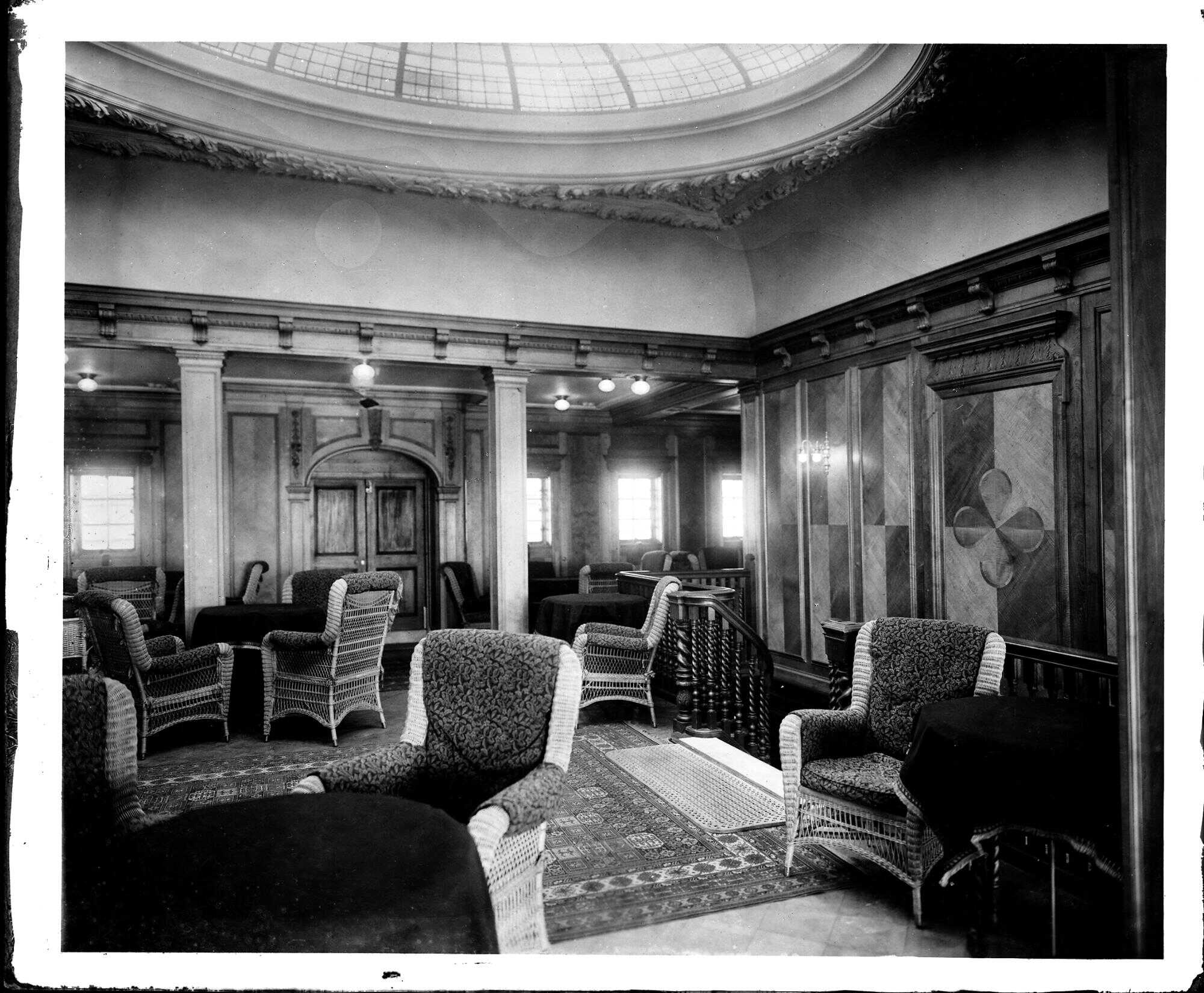
Niagara's first class smoking room in 1913

Niagara had two double-ended and six single-ended boilers, heated by a total of 40 corrugated furnaces. The boilers supplied steam at 220 lb_{f}/in^{2} to the high-pressure cylinders of her triple-expansion engines. She was equipped to burn either coal or oil. On her maiden voyage she burnt coal.

Niagara was the first oil-burning steamship to be certificated by the Board of Trade to carry passengers. Oil was both a more efficient fuel and could be bunkered more quickly. In 1913 it could take a week to bunker a large liner with enough coal to get from Sydney to Vancouver, and she would need to be bunkered again in Vancouver to make the return voyage. Niagara's fuel tanks had capacity for 5,000 tons of oil, and she could bunker enough oil in 30 hours to make a 15,000 nautical miles (28,000 km) round trip from Sydney to Vancouver and back. This was a valuable saving in both time and harbour dues.

=== Accommodation ===
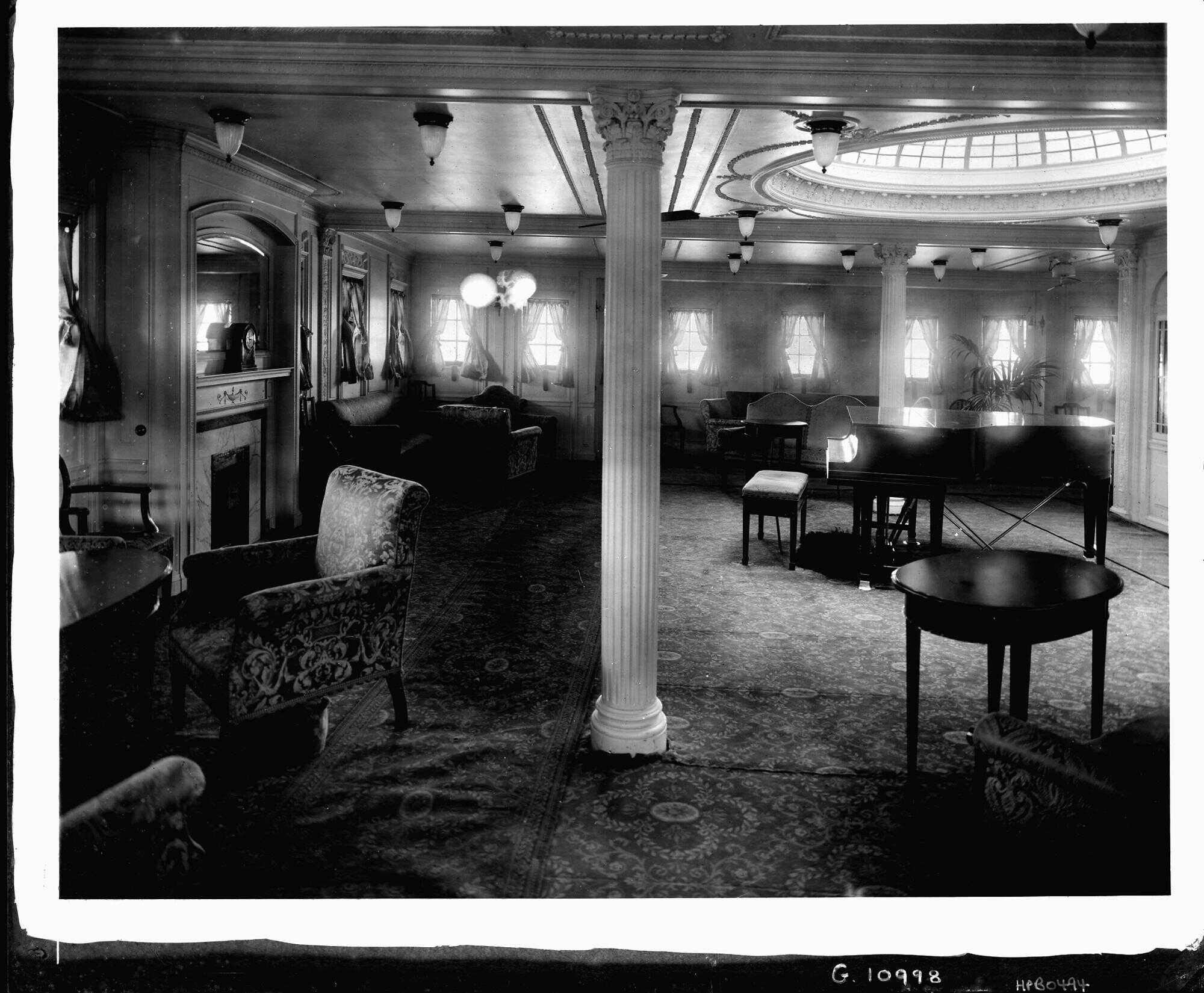
Niagara's first class music room in 1913

Niagara was built with berths for 281 first class, 210 second class and 176 third class passengers. Her first class accommodation was amidships, spread over her main, upper, shelter and promenade decks and included two cabins de luxe, each with its own bathroom. Her second class accommodation was aft, and third class accommodation was in the forward part of the ship.

Much of Niagara's interior décor was in historicist styles. One of her first class cabins de luxe was in Louis XIV style. Her other cabin de luxe and her first class music room were in Adam style. Her first class dining saloon, lounge and library, and second-class music and smoking rooms were all in Louis XVI style. Her second class dining saloon was in Georgian style. The ceilings of the first class dining saloon and smoking room each had a domed skylight. The Daily Telegraph in Sydney called Niagara "a magnificent liner".

Niagara had her own hospital. Mindful of the great loss of life on the Titanic in April 1912, the Union Company stressed that Niagara had enough lifeboats for all her passengers and crew. She also carried a steam launch.

== Sister ship ==
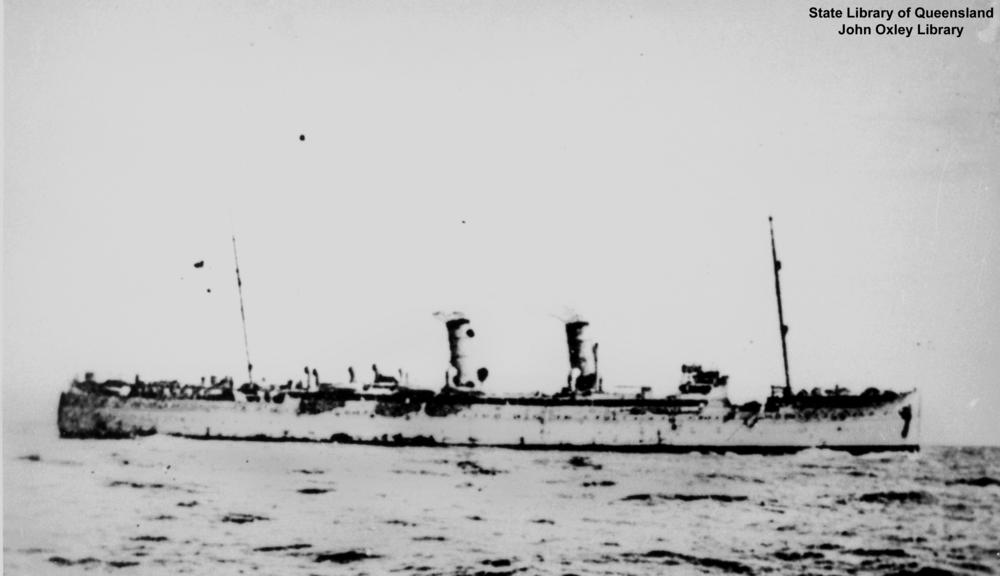
Niagara's sister ship HMS Avenger

At the end of 1913 the Union Company ordered a running mate for Niagara from the Fairfield Shipbuilding & Engineering Company in Govan, Glasgow. She was to be a sister ship, but 30 ft (9 m) longer and a greater tonnage (15300 grt). Unlike Niagara, the new ship was propelled entirely by turbines, and had only two screws. She was launched on 30 June 1915 as Aotearoa, the Māori name for New Zealand.

The Admiralty requisitioned Aotearoa and renamed her HMS Avenger. She was completed on 14 December 1915 as an armed merchant cruiser. U-boat U-69 sank her with a torpedo on 14 June 1917 at 61°01'48"N 3°34'12"W, between the Faeroes and Shetlands.

== Entry into service ==
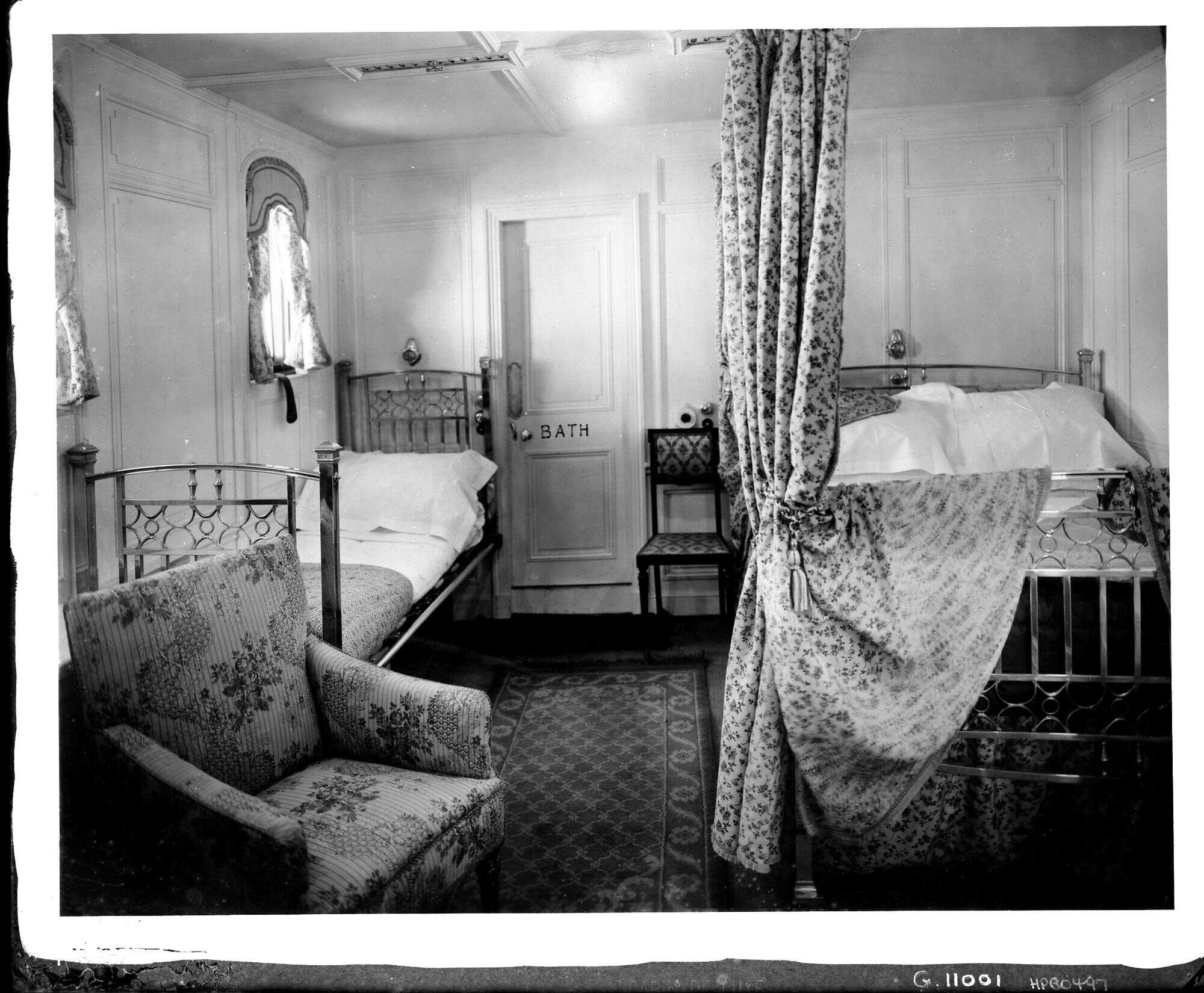
One of Niagara's two first class cabins de luxe in 1913

The Union Company was based in New Zealand but it registered its ships in London. Many members of her crew were Australian, and they were employed under Australian articles.

Niagara was built for the Union Company's transpacific service between Australia and Vancouver via New Zealand, Fiji and Hawaii. It was informally called the All-Red Line, like the telegraph cable network of the same name.

However, her maiden voyage was to deliver her from Scotland to Australia. She sailed from Glasgow via Plymouth, Durban and Melbourne to Sydney. She reached Melbourne on 22 April 1913 and Sydney on 24 April.

When Niagara reached Melbourne the Auckland Star called her "an unsinkable ship" and praised her as "one of the most palatial and up-to-date steamers seen in Australia". When she reached Auckland a fortnight later, the Auckland Star said her arrival marked "a new epoch in the growth of New Zealand's trans-oceanic trade". Stressing her large cargo capacity, the newspaper said "She cannot fail to encourage trade between New Zealand and Canada", and that she would "inevitably aid the great work of consolidating the Empire".

Niagara was scheduled to leave Sydney on 5 May on her first voyage to Vancouver. She returned from Vancouver and reached Auckland on 1 July 1913, having covered the 6,330 nautical miles (11,720 km) at an average of 15 1/2 knots (28.7 km/h).

== Setting records ==
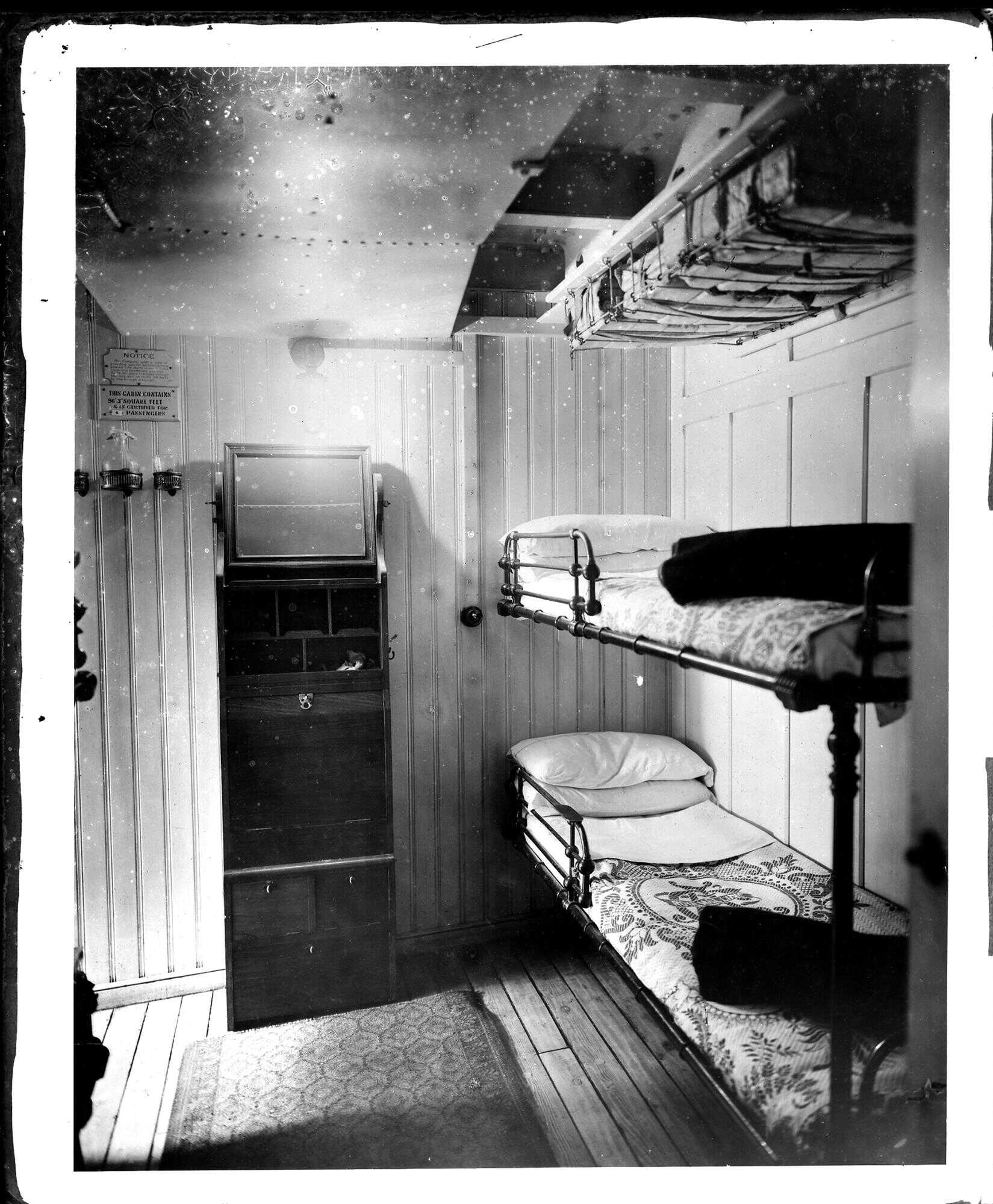
One of Niagara's third class cabins in 1913

In January 1914 Niagara set a record for crossing the Tasman Sea. Despite a strong northeast wind on the first day she steamed from Sydney to Auckland in three days and two and a half hours, which broke the previous record by four hours. Her Master, Captain Morrisby, stated that she had maintained a speed of about 17 1/2 knots (32.4 km/h) and must at times have reached 18 knots (33 km/h). In July 1914 Niagara broke her own record with a crossing from Sydney to Auckland of three days and half an hour.

In May 1915 Niagara set a new westbound record across the Tasman Sea by steaming from Auckland to Sydney in three days and 23 minutes. This record stood until 1931.

As well as breaking Australasian speed records, Niagara gained a reputation for reliability, and for stability in all weathers.

== World War I ==
On 28 July 1914 World War I began. On 15 August Niagara and another Union Company liner, Marama, were held for some days at Honolulu because the German cruiser SMS Leipzig was reported to be near the coast of British Columbia. During the war Niagara sailed blacked out, and she varied her course and speed in response to reported sightings of German warships.

In March 1915, en route from Sydney to Auckland, Niagara lost one blade from her middle screw. This unbalanced the screw, which damaged both her middle propeller shaft and its bearing. Her engineers shut down her turbine and she reached Auckland on 22 March at 15 knots (28 km/h) using only her port and starboard screws driven by her triple-expansion engines.

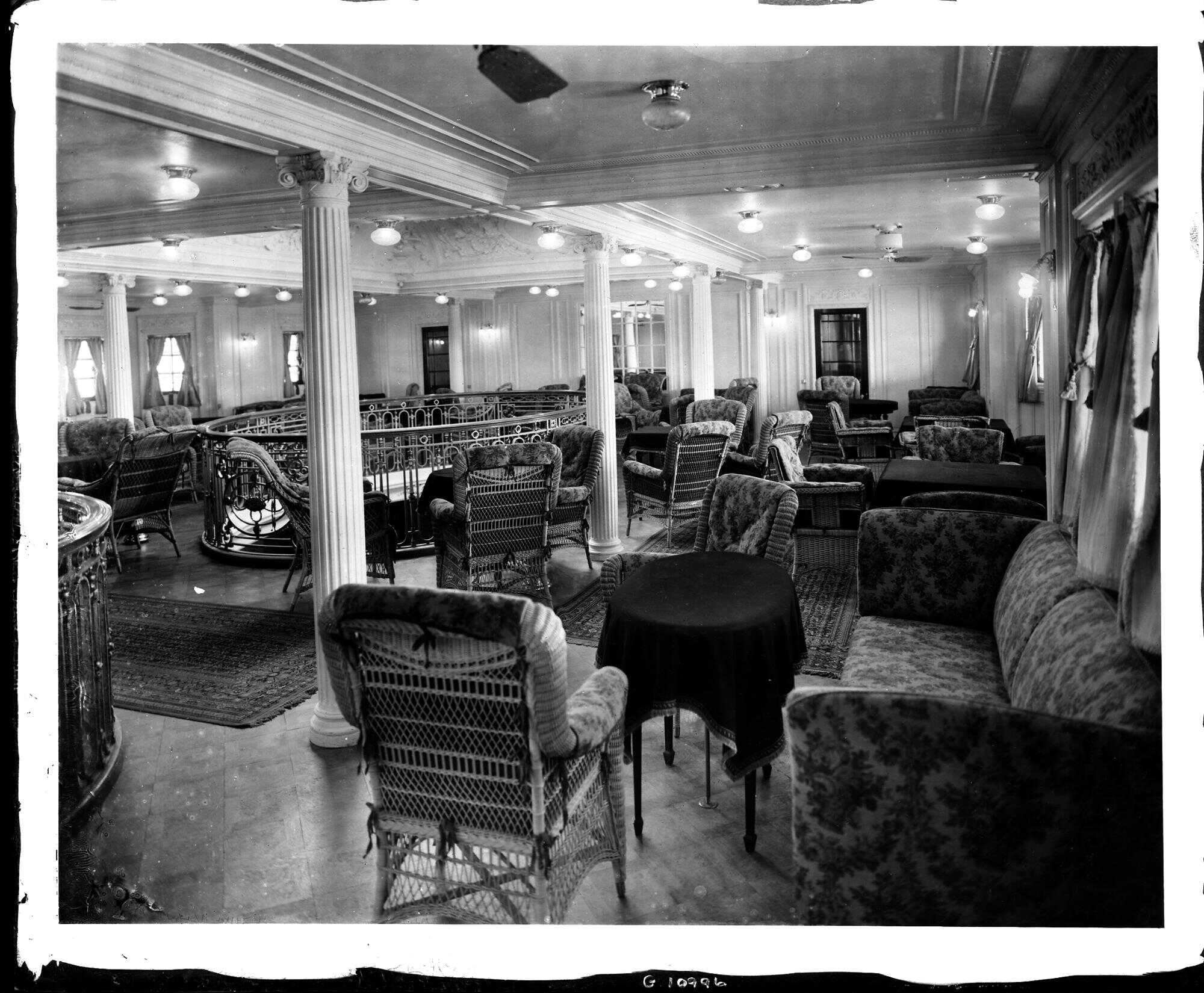
Niagara's first class smoking lounge in 1913

Niagara carried a spare propeller shaft and screw. She was dry docked in Calliope Dock, where her damaged propeller shaft and screw were removed and replacements installed. Engineers worked around the clock and completed the repair in 40 hours, enabling Niagara to leave the dock on 26 March and return to service. At the time Niagara was the largest ship to have been dry docked in New Zealand. She fitted into Calliope Dock with just 12 inches (300 mm) clearance fore and aft and 10 inches (250 mm) on either side.

In May 1915 wartime security aboard Niagara was tightened. Police, customs and military authorities in Sydney thoroughly searched the ship, and searched all baggage and questioning all crew and passengers before allowing them aboard. Security in Auckland was also tightened.

By December 1915 there was a shortage of merchant seafarers in Sydney, and ships including Niagara had difficulty finding enough to make a full complement. But there was a particular shortage of stokers and trimmers, which affected Niagara less because she normally burned oil instead of coal.

In March 1918 it was reported that at some time in the war the German auxiliary cruiser SMS Wolf twice came close to intercepting Niagara. The report did not say when either incident took place. Later it was claimed that Wolf's seaplane once sighted Niagara, but the liner outran Wolf. Wolf also evaded capture, and returned to Germany in February 1918.

== Spanish flu ==
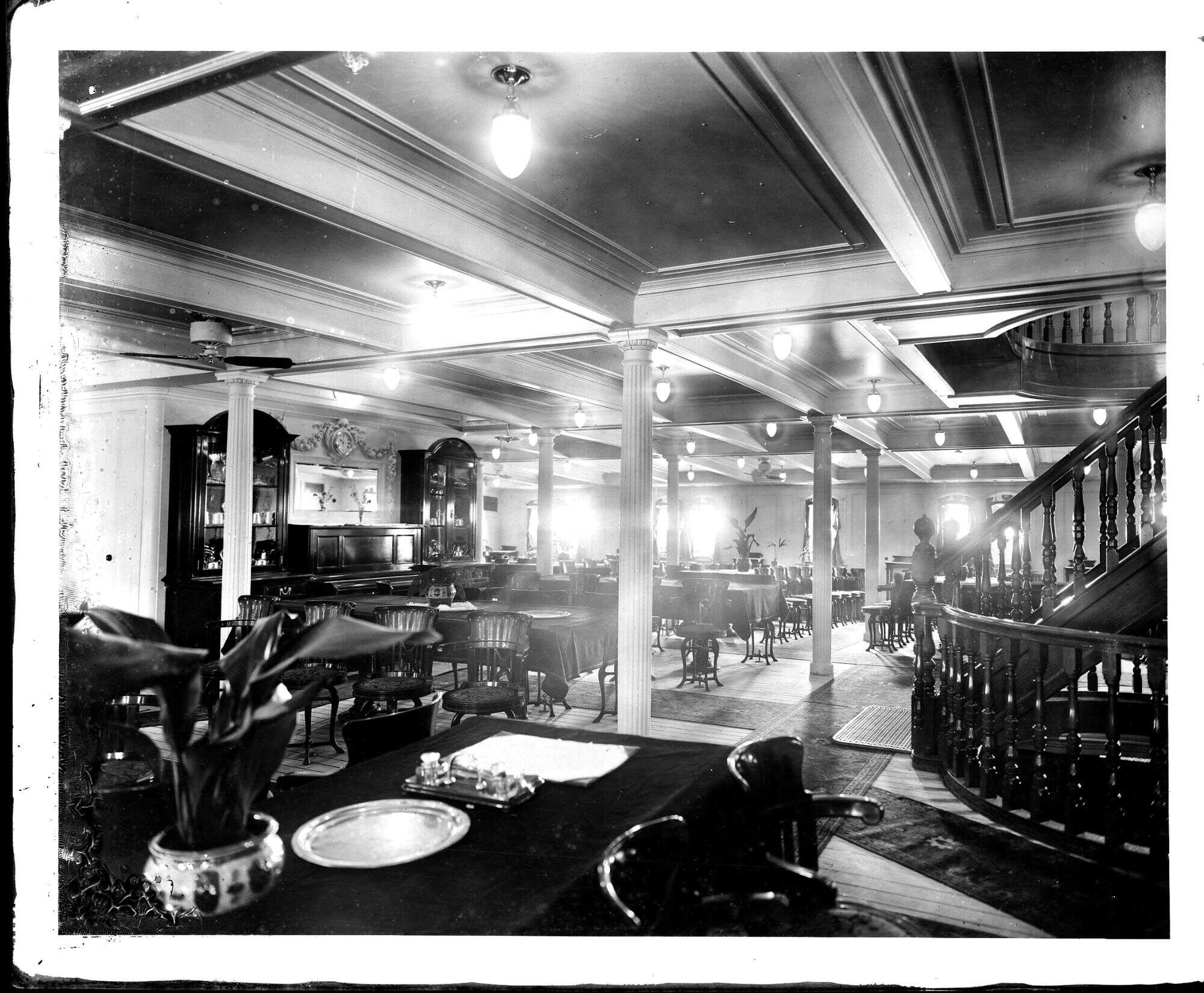
Niagara's second class dining saloon in 1913

In October 1918, Spanish flu broke out aboard Niagara on a voyage from Vancouver to Auckland. She had left Vancouver on 21 September, and reached Honolulu ten days later. The next day she left Honolulu, and thereafter her stewards began to fall ill. She reached Suva four days after leaving Honolulu, on about 5 October. By then there were about 50 or 60 cases. Her ship's doctor, Dr Latchmore, fell ill, and two passengers, Drs Mackenzie and Barnett, took over.

After Niagara left Suva, passengers and members of the crew also began to fall ill. So many people were infected that women passengers were recruited as volunteer stewards. Niagara's hospital had only about 10 beds. Dr Mackenzie later testified that the outbreak was "in practically every portion of the ship" and little was done to isolate the sick. He also stated that her crew's quarters were "very crowded" and "Their condition was very miserable when we had so many sick men in the tropical heat".

On 11 October one patient aboard Niagara died of bronchial pneumonia. By then more than 100 of her crew were infected, and 25 cases were described as needing transfer to hospital. But Dr Mackenzie considered that the outbreak was "ordinary influenza". One case was complicated by pneumonia, but Mackenzie attributed it to the fact that that patient had suffered a poison gas attack in the war.

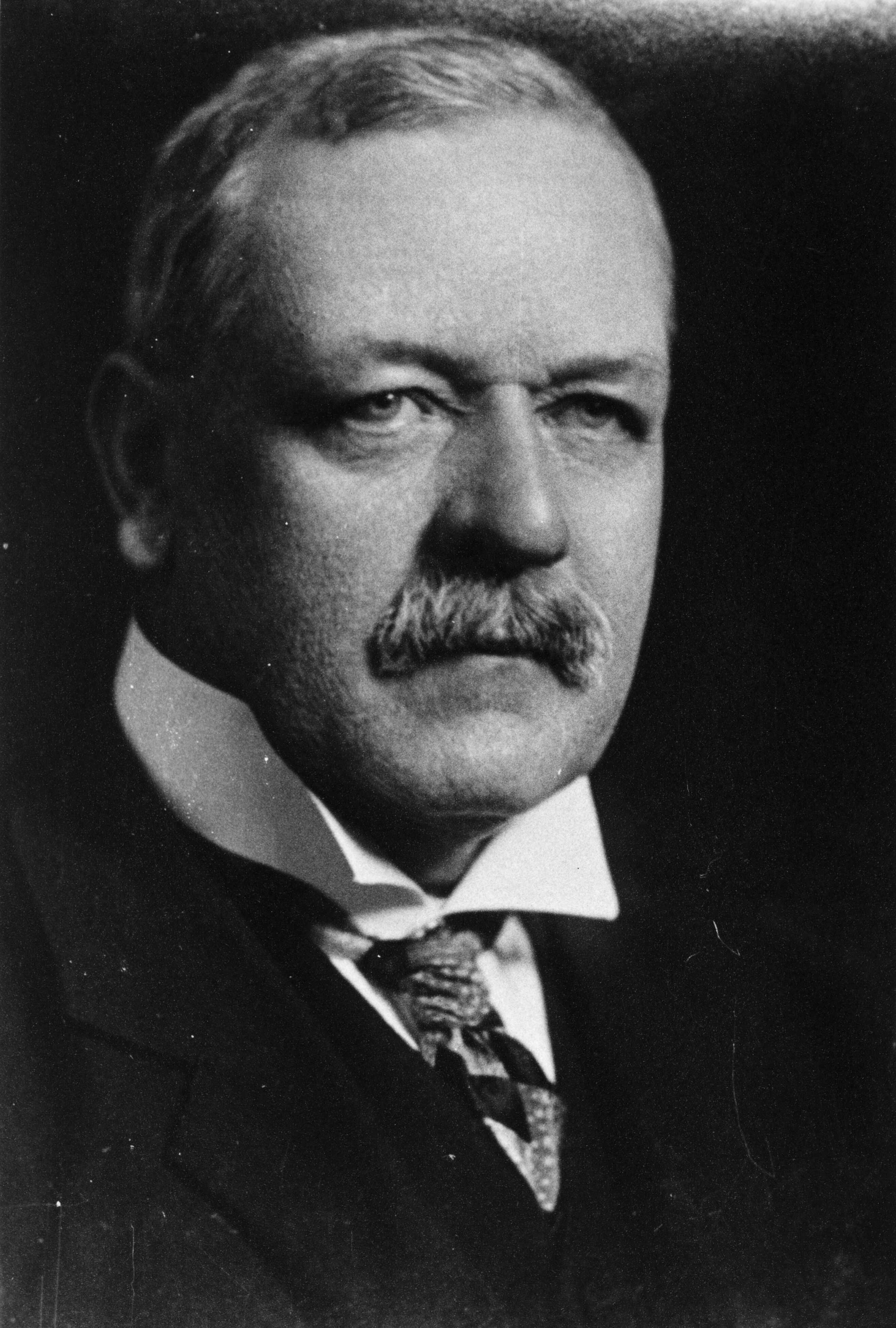
George Russell, NZ Minister of Health when Spanish flu broke out aboard Niagara

On 12 October the Minister of Health, George Russell, told the Governor-General of New Zealand, the Earl of Liverpool, that Spanish flu was not a notifiable disease, and therefore he could not quarantine Niagara unless the Governor-General were to issue a proclamation to that effect. Later that day Niagara docked in Auckland. The Port Health Officer, Dr CC Russell, went aboard and examined the patients. Dr Russell agreed with Mackenzie that all the influenza cases were "simple influenza". Dr Russell examined the pneumonia patient and concluded that the complication was not caused by Spanish flu.

On 12 October, Dr Hughes, Auckland's District Health Officer, sent GW Russell a telegram informing him that one influenza patient aboard Niagara had died of pneumonia. GW Russell replied telling him to give clearance for people to disambark from the ship.

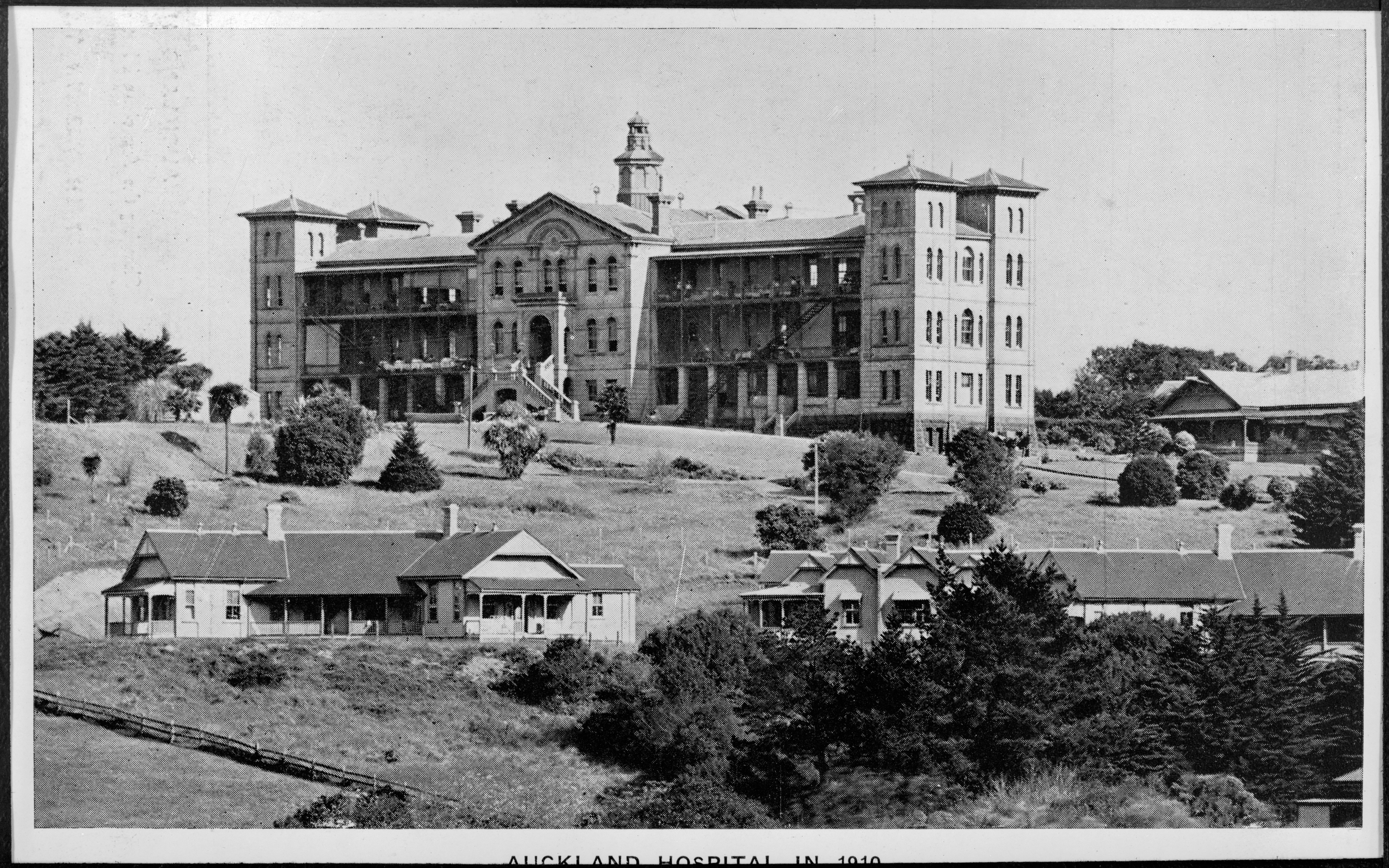
37 Spanish flu patients were moved from Niagara to Auckland City Hospital

After Niagara docked, 28 patients were transferred from her to Auckland City Hospital and 10 were kept aboard ship to be treated. 10 contracted pneumonia, which often followed Spanish flu. Niagara's second class smoking room and second class cabins were converted into temporary hospitals.

Between 13 and 21 October nine more cases were transferred from Niagara to the hospital. Two patients died after being transferred to the hospital. Another died aboard Niagara the day before she left Auckland. 160 of Auckland Hospital's 180 nurses became infected, and two died.

When Niagara reached Sydney, 296 passengers and about 200 crew were detained for seven days at North Head Quarantine Station. About 280 of the passengers were released from quarantine on 1 November.

Among the passengers who disembarked from Niagara at Auckland were the then New Zealand Prime Minister, William Massey, and his Minister of Finance, Joseph Ward. A newspaper alleged that the reason why GW Russell failed to quarantine the ship was in order to avoid inconveniencing the two statesmen.

In November 1918 Opposition MPs in the New Zealand House of Representatives criticised the Government's handling of the Spanish flu epidemic. Peter Fraser questioned GW Russell's response to the outbreak aboard Niagara, and Harry Holland called for a Royal Commission of inquiry.

On 25 January 1919 Niagara was quarantined at Auckland on arrival from Sydney. She had one patient with bronchial influenza, who was transferred to the quarantine station on Motuihe Island.

=== Influenza Epidemic Commission ===
In 1919 the Governor-General of New Zealand appointed an Influenza Epidemic Commission. Its terms of reference included "All matters connected with the arrival in New Zealand waters of the SS 'Niagara' and SS 'Makura' in respect to their bearing on the introduction and extension of the epidemic". The Makura was another Union Company ship, and at the time was Niagara's running mate on the All-Red Line. Makura, unlike Niagara, was quarantined. Three of her patients died.

Witnesses who testified to the Commission included Drs Hughes, Mackenzie and Russell, Dr Maguire, Medical Superintendent of Auckland Hospital, and Dr Milsom of the Auckland Branch of the New Zealand Division of the British Medical Association. Dr Maguire stated that the hospital had admitted no cases of influenza "for some months" before Niagara arrived. Dr Milson told the Commission that the BMA's opinion was that "Niagara was the cause of the epidemic" in New Zealand.

However, before Niagara arrived there had been an outbreak near Auckland in the military camp at Narrow Neck. The first cases were recorded on 30 September. One doctor from the camp stated that on 10 October there were 169 cases, 39 were severe and three were pneumonic. Another stated there were 230 by 12 October. There was then a lull until 19 October, when cases at Narrow Neck increased again. About half of the cases at Narrow Neck that were diagnosed after 19 October were pneumonic, and from 20 October there were deaths.

On 13 May 1919 the Commission published an interim report. It found, inter alia:

"That, although the latter is not one capable of absolute demonstration, the evidence before is raises a very strong presumption that a substantial factor in the introduction of the epidemic was the arrival in Auckland on the 12th October of the s.s. "Niagara" with patients infected with the epidemic disease."

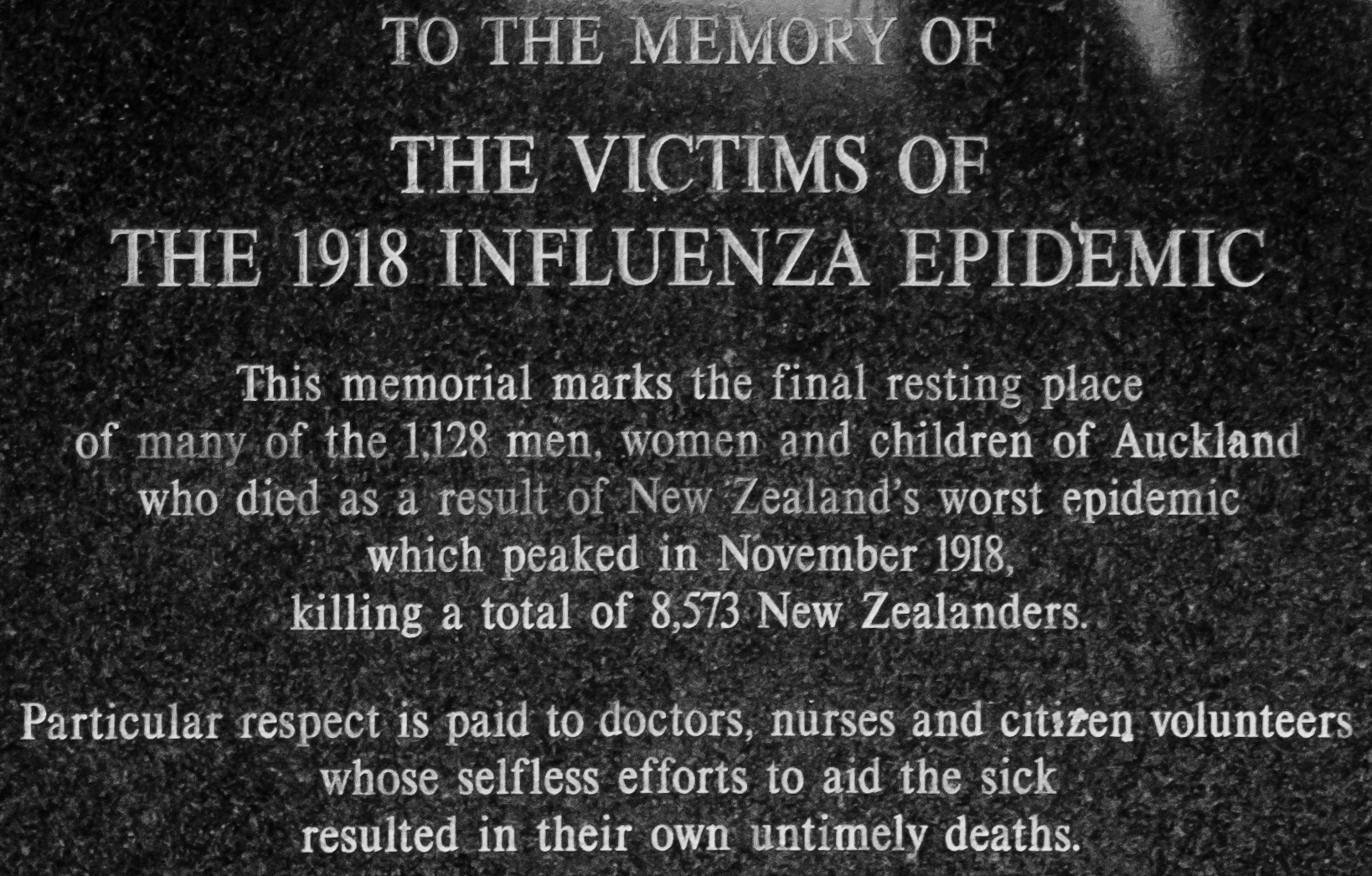
Inscription on the monument to victims of the Spanish flu epidemic in Waikumete Cemetery, Auckland

The report exonerated Massey and Ward from interfering with the decision not to quarantine the ship, but it criticised Dr Russell for accepting Dr Mackenzie's diagnoses of "simple influenza", and GW Russell for not quarantining Niagara when the outbreak aboard her "made her a menace to the health of the city" (of Auckland).

The Commission was given evidence that the condition of crew accommodation on a number of ships was unhealthy. WT Young, General Secretary of the Seamen's Union of Australia, raised this with the Union Company, and the Commission reported that "we were assured that considerable improvements were being effected in that company's vessels". However, the report suggested that the powers and duties of port health officers did not go far enough, and it called for "a regular procedure of constant supervision over the sanitary and hygienic conditions of the wharves and shipping".

== Aorangi ==
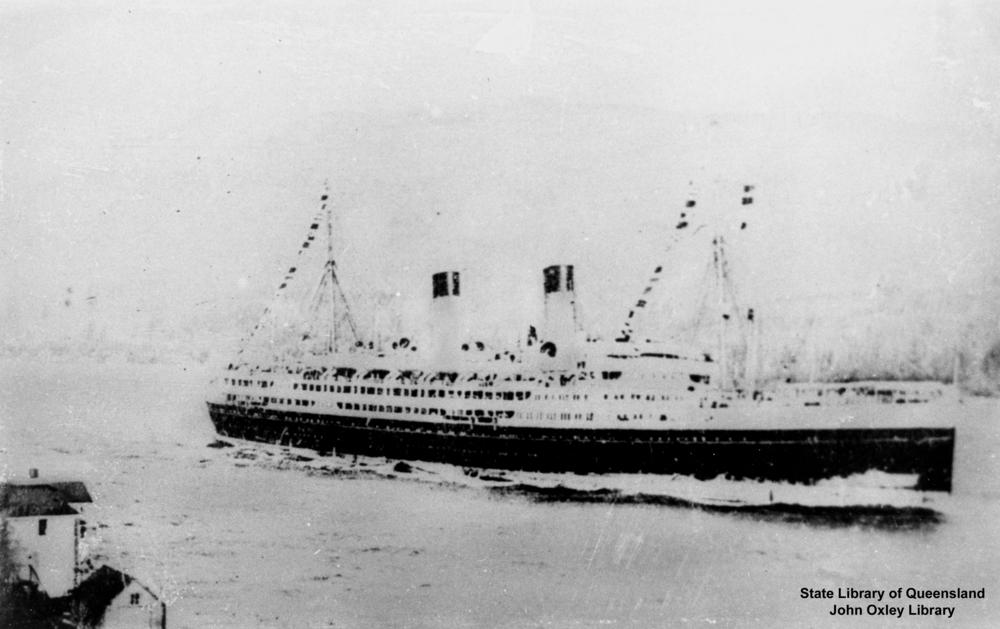
Aorangi joined Niagara on the All-Red Line in 1925

In 1920 the Union Company revived its plan for a new liner to share the All-Red Line with Niagara. That June it announced that the new ship would be propelled by reduction-geared turbines like HMS Avenger, and capable of 18 knots (33 km/h) like Niagara. But the new ship would be considerably larger: 18,000 GRT and more than 600 feet (180 m) long. But in the 1920s marine diesel engines advanced rapidly in size and power. This led the Union Company to change its plans and order a motor ship.

Aorangi was launched in 1924 in Scotland and reached Sydney on 3 March 1925. At 17,491 GRT she supplanted Niagara as the largest ship in the Union Company fleet. Between them Niagara and Aorangi were scheduled to provide a regular service with timetabled departures from Sydney and Vancouver every four weeks.

== Incidents and rescues ==
in February 1923 a cyclone struck Niagara in passage from Suva to Auckland. An Australian able seaman who had been working on her boat deck, William Kew, was swept overboard, and at least one passenger was injured. Niagara turned back and searched two hours for A/b Kew, but did not find him. The cyclone forced Niagara to heave to for a few hours, and she made only very slow progress for another 24.

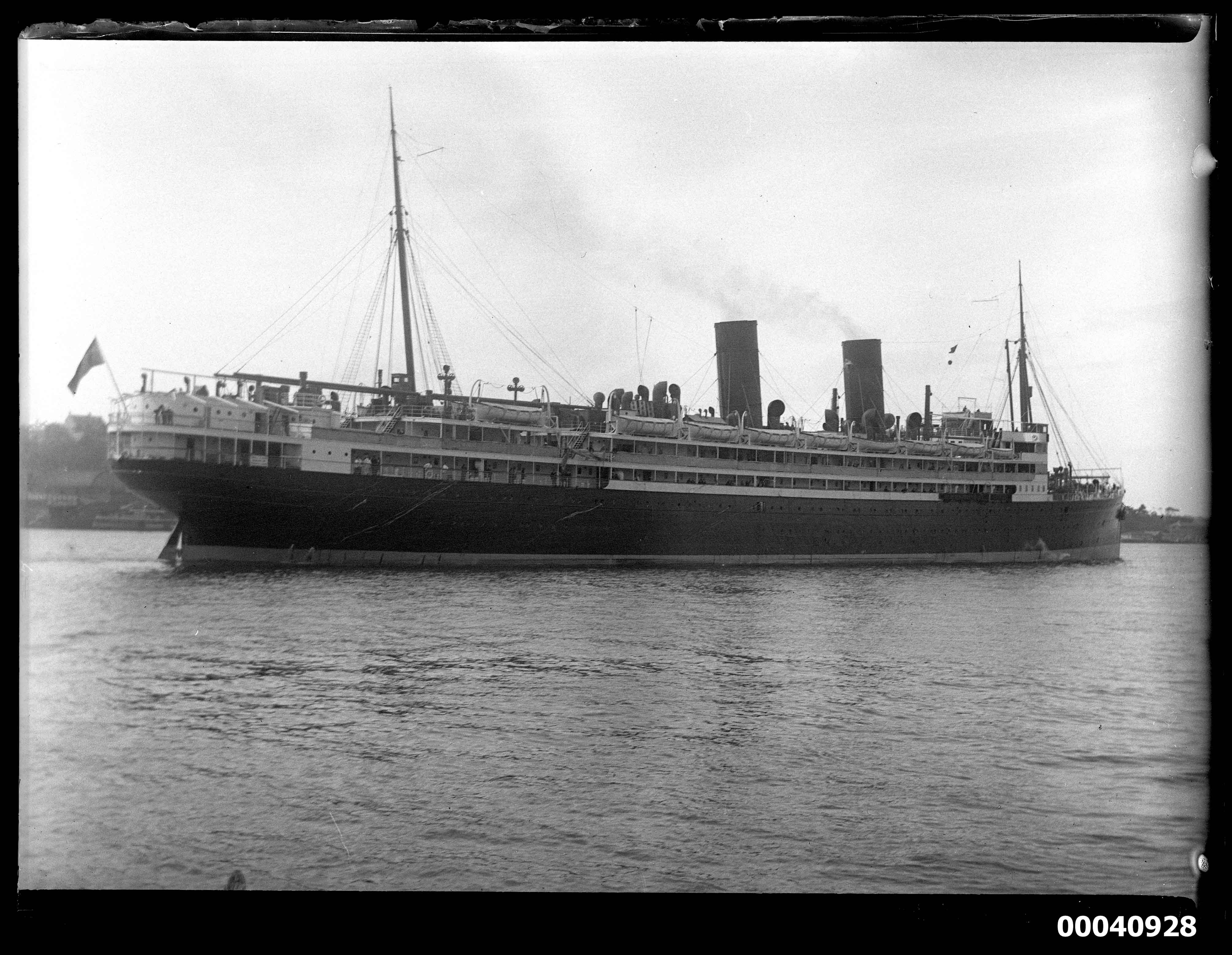
Niagara leaving Sydney in 1924

=== Doris Crane ===
On the morning of 19 December 1927 the three-masted schooner Doris Crane was sailing from Fanning Island to San Francisco with a cargo of copra when fuel for her auxiliary diesel engine caught fire. Her crew fought the fire, but it spread and her engineer died of burns. At 1530 hrs on 20 December the crew abandoned ship in two lifeboats about 340 nautical miles (630 km) north of Hawaii.

Doris Crane had no wireless, but at 0400 hrs on 20 December Niagara's lookouts saw the glare of the fire from 20 nautical miles (37 km) away and she changed course to assist. By the time Niagara arrived, the lifeboats had drifted away from the burning schooner. After three hours' search Niagara found the two boats. She landed five of the survivors at Honolulu on 22 December and the remaining nine at Suva.

=== Ika ===
On 26 February 1928 the 38 ft (12 m) fishing launch Ika suffered engine failure between Tiri Tiri Island and The Noises in the Hauraki Gulf. Her crew tried to reach Kawau Island by sail power, but her sail was blown away. A heavy sea strained her hull and her crew were bailing constantly. She drifted for two days and nights, by which time she was half-full of water.

At about 1955 hrs on 28 February the crew sighted Niagara, which had just left Auckland for Sydney. The fishermen lit benzene flares, which were seen by Niagara's Second Officer. Niagara changed course and rescued the three fishermen with one of her lifeboats about 10 nautical miles (19 km) off Hen and Chicken Islands. Ika had drifted about 50 nautical miles (93 km), and a southwesterly wind was driving her farther off-shore when Niagara reached her.

=== Vancouver wharf ===
On 30 January 1931 Niagara collided with a concrete wharf in fog as she came into berth at Vancouver. Eight steel plates of her bow were damaged. Repairs were estimated to cost £1,500, and were completed in time for her to begin her return voyage on schedule. After she reached Sydney, Niagara was dry docked at Cockatoo Island on 2 March for further repairs.

=== King Egbert ===
On the evening of 17 July 1935 the 4,535 GRT cargo motor ship King Egbert collided with Niagara in fog in the Strait of Juan de Fuca about 40 nautical miles (74 km) off Victoria. Niagara had just left Vancouver, and her passengers included the Prime Minister of Australia, Joseph Lyons.

Both ships returned to port for survey. King Egbert's bow was stove in, and Niagara's hull was damaged above the waterline on her port side forward, abreast of her number one hold. The Wreck Commissioner took evidence from the Masters of both ships and found that neither was to blame. Niagara was dry docked at Esquimalt for repairs. She returned to service on 1 August and reached Auckland on 19 August.

=== Firework explosion ===
On 27 October 1937 Niagara was at a wharf in Darling Harbour having 300 cases of fireworks loaded into her number two hold when one of the cases exploded. Dock workers were blown through the air, five were injured, one later died of his injuries and three others were treated in hospital. Windows were broken more than 200 yards away.

The fireworks had been made in China, arrived on the steamship Nankin and were being transhipped at Sydney for export to Fiji. They were of a type that can be detonated by shock, and which were banned in New South Wales. The remaining cases of fireworks were removed to Bantry Bay Explosives Depot.

== Wireless developments ==
When Niagara entered service she was equipped for wireless telegraphy on the 300 and 600 metre wavelengths. Her original call sign was GBE.

In 1925 the Amalgamated Wireless Company built a new, powerful shortwave beam wireless transmitter for her that was installed when she was overhauled in Sydney from February to April 1925. That April and May, Niagara set new wireless records by transmitting and receiving signals to and from both Australia and Canada throughout her voyage to Vancouver and back. While moored in Vancouver she sent a signal to Pennant Hills, and on her return voyage from Vancouver she succeeded in transmitting wireless signals from the Pacific Ocean to England. This was a new record for the Marconi Company, achieved with a transmitter power of less than one Kilowatt.

In January 1928, as Niagara crossed the Tasman Sea, she exchanged signals with a wireless station in Burnham-on-Sea in England. In 1925 Niagara had succeeded in transmitting to England from somewhere in the Pacific, but this latest achievement was claimed as a new record. A service was established by which passengers could send messages to England at a cost of 11 pence per word.

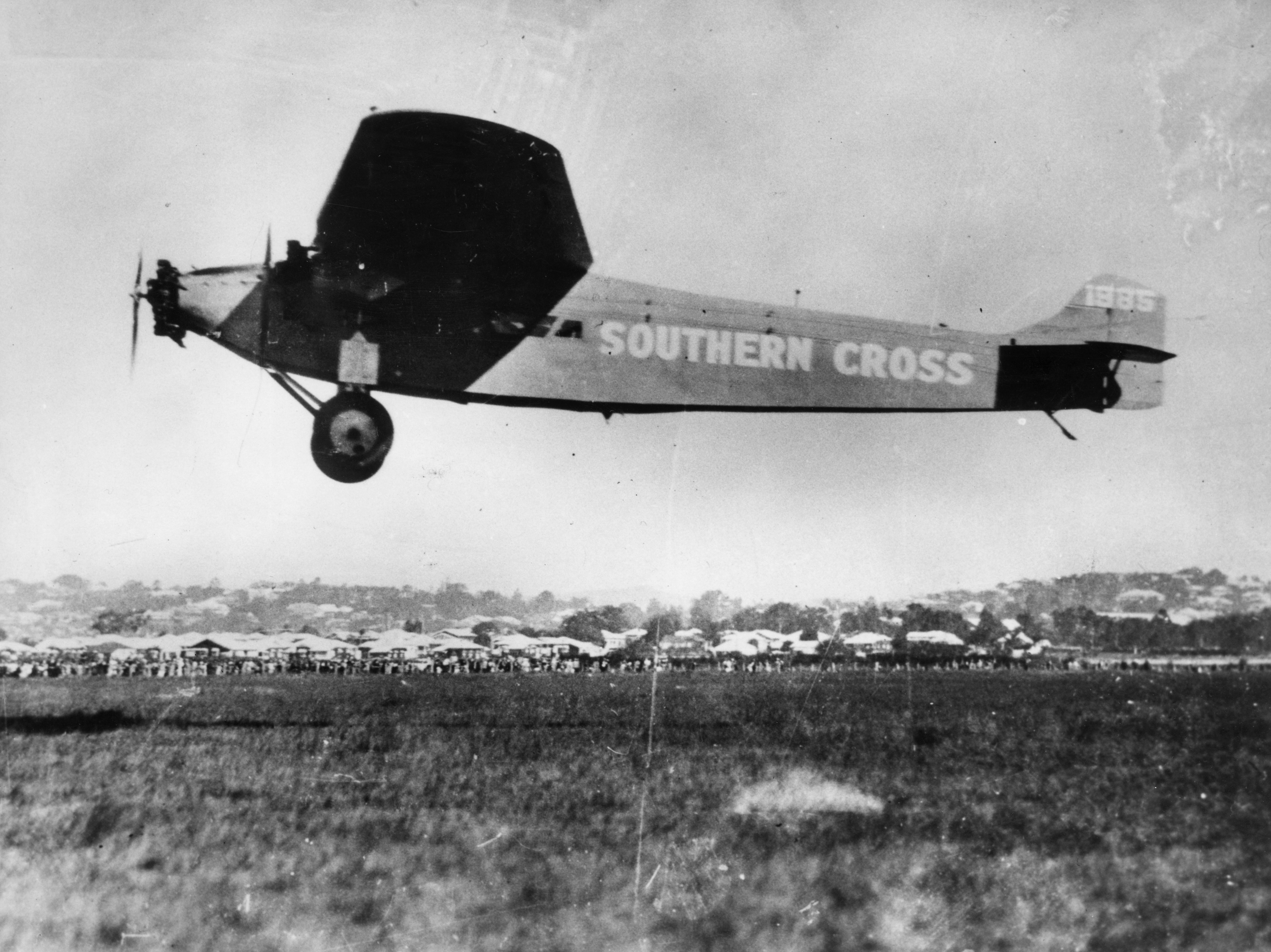
Southern Cross landing at Brisbane

Between 28 May and 9 June 1928 the Fokker F.VII aircraft Southern Cross made the World's first flight across the Pacific: from California via Fiji and Hawaii to Queensland. Its crew maintained hourly wireless contact with Niagara on each leg of the flight.

In 1934 the new wireless call sign GNXP superseded Niagara's code letters JBSG and her original wireless call sign.

In February 1936 the New Zealand Marine Department established a wireless direction finding beacon on Tiri Tiri Island, and asked ships to help to test it. Niagara's master recommended that a second beacon was needed for ships to fix their position by triangulation. However, the beacon on Tiri Tiri enabled ships to get accurate bearings from a range of up to 88 nautical miles (163 km).

== Modifications ==
By October 1928 refrigerating equipment had been installed in Niagara's number one hold. This increased her refrigerated capacity by 450 tons, bringing the total to 81,560 cubic feet (2,310 m^{3}).

In August 1929 Niagara received a month-long overhaul in Sydney. The domed skylight in her first class dining saloon was removed in order to increase the deck area of the first class lounge, which was immediately above the saloon. Her passenger accommodation was re-painted, re-decorated, re-carpeted, much of her furniture was replaced and the remainder was re-upholstered.

In 1933 first Aorangi and then Niagara were given their biennial overhauls in Sydney. The Union Company's Monowai was to deputise for each ship in turn. Niagara was withdrawn from service when she reached Sydney on 14 August. Large sections of her deck were re-laid, and equipment to screen sound films aboard was installed in one of her lounges. Niagara returned to service at Sydney on 12 October as scheduled. The combined cost of overhauling the two ships was £60,000.

== Canadian–Australasian Line ==
In 1930 Niagara made her hundredth round trip between Australia, New Zealand and Canada.

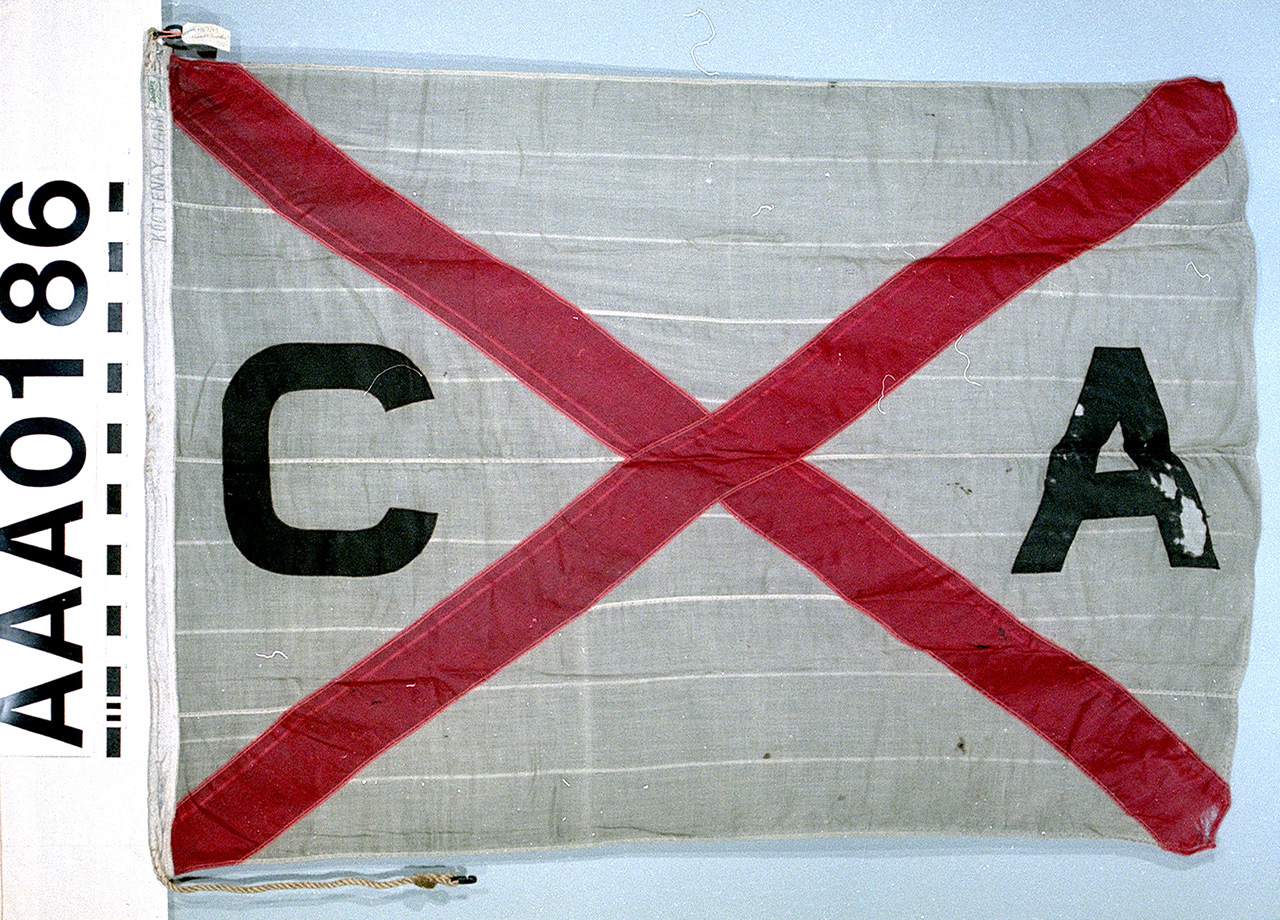
Canadian-Australasian Line house flag

In 1931 the Union Company anticipated competition from Matson Line of the USA, which had ordered two new liners, Mariposa and Monterey, to run between the West Coast of the United States and Australia via Hawaii, Fiji and New Zealand. They would be swifter than Niagara and Aorangi, and the Federal government of the United States subsidised US ships US$10 per mile to carry mail, which gave them a competitive advantage over UK and Empire ships. In response the Union Company and Canadian Pacific created a new jointly owned subsidiary, Canadian-Australasian Line, to which the Union Company transferred Niagara and Aorangi.

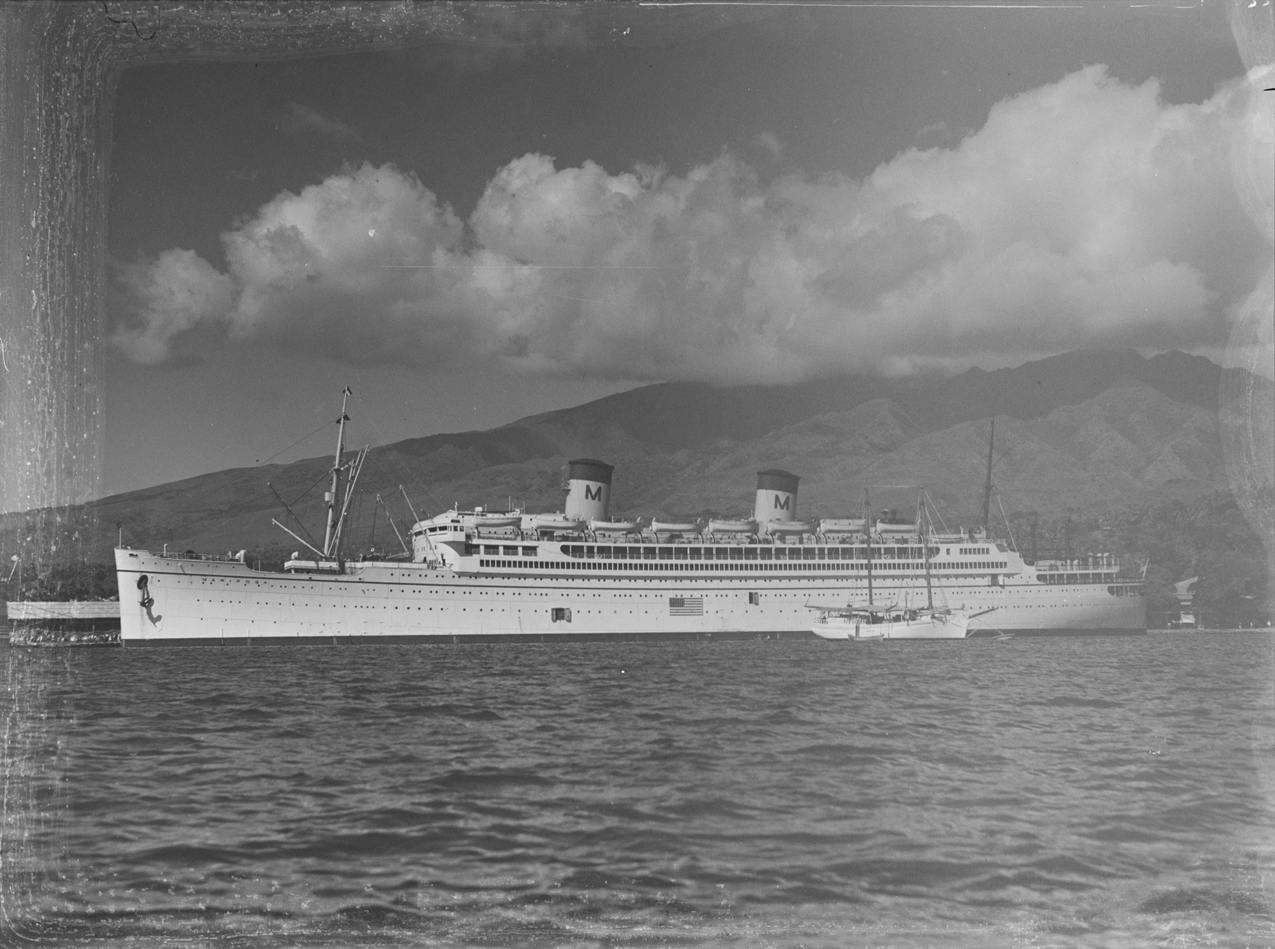
The Matson liner Mariposa, which with her sister ship Monterey competed with Niagara and Aorangi from 1932 between Sydney, Auckland, Suva and Honolulu

In June 1936 the UK government commissioned the Imperial Shipping Committee to examine merchant shipping in the Pacific, including problems caused by subsidised US competition. Canadian Pacific's Chairman, Sir Edward Beatty, sought support from the governments of the UK, Canada, Australia, New Zealand and Fiji to improve Canadian-Australasian's trans-pacific service. He proposed a pair of 22,000 GRT, 22-knot (41 km/h) liners at a cost of £2.5 million if the governments would subsidise the service. P&O, which owned the Union Company, supported the proposal. The Imperial Shipping Committee recognised the problem but proposed no solution.

In May and June 1937 an Imperial Conference considered matters including shipping, which faced increasing Japanese competition as well as subsidised competition from US ships. Beatty reiterated his proposal for new 22,000 GRT liners to replace Niagara and Aorangi. Hopes were raised but no agreement was reached.

In 1938 Niagara celebrated 25 years in service. By then she had completed about 150 round trips between Australia, New Zealand and Canada.

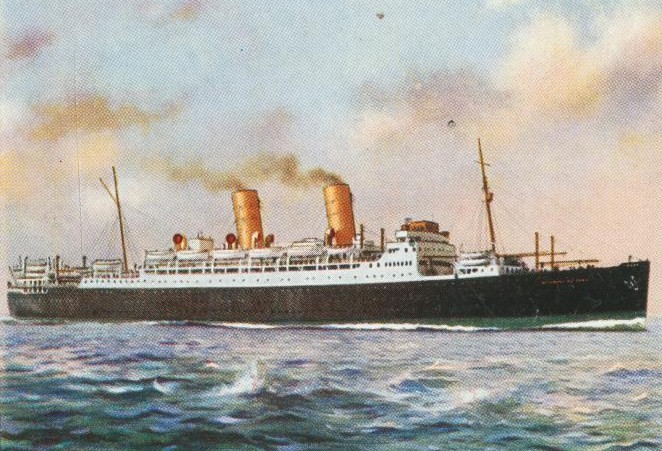
In 1939 Duchess of York was proposed as a possible replacement for Niagara

In July 1939 Sir Edward Beatty stated that the cost of shipbuilding had now risen too high for new ships to be ordered for the transpacific route. Instead there was a proposal that the 20,021 GRT Canadian Pacific liner Duchess of York, or one of her sister ships, could be modified for trans-pacific service to replace Niagara.

On 1 September 1939 World War II began. That October Canadian-Australasian Line introduced a 33 per cent war surcharge on passenger fares. In January 1940 this was reduced to 15 per cent to encourage travel between Australia and New Zealand.

== Loss ==
On the night of 13–14 June 1940 the German auxiliary cruiser Orion laid a field of 228 contact mines across the mouth of the Hauraki Gulf: in a bid to blockade Auckland, New Zealand's largest commercial port. For the next four days ships passed in and out of Auckland without hitting any of the mines.

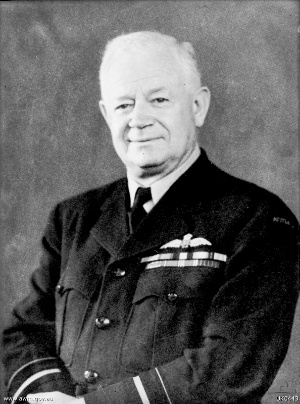
AVM Stanley Goble was among passengers rescued from Niagara

On the night of 18–19 June Niagara left Auckland. She was carrying passengers including RAAF Air Vice Marshal Stanley Goble, who with his wife was en route to Canada to be air liaison officer in Ottawa. Her cargo included half of New Zealand's entire stock of small arms ammunition. It was being sent via Canada to mitigate a shortage in the Dunkirk evacuation. In her strong room she was secretly carrying 590 gold bars from South Africa, valued at £2,500,000. They were a payment from the United Kingdom to the then-neutral United States for munitions.

At 0340 hrs on 19 June Niagara's bow struck one of Orion's mines off Bream Head. The explosion blew the hatch cover and stanchions off her forward hold. The cover was blown into the sea, complete with a motor car that had been secured to it as deck cargo.

Niagara fired distress flares, her wireless operator transmitted a distress message and her crew launched her 18 lifeboats. Everyone aboard successfully abandoned ship in 90 minutes, without loss of life, and with only a few minor injuries. Sources disagree on the number of people involved. They are variously cited as 202 or 203 crew, and 136, 146 or 148 passengers. The evacuation was helped by her electric lighting continuing to function.

Niagara's stern rose clear of the water before she sank by her bow at 0532 hrs in 70 fathoms (130 m) of water between the Mokohinau Islands and Hen and Chicken Islands. Her sinking ended a 27-year career in which Niagara made 162 round trips between Australia, New Zealand and Canada and sailed nearly 2,500,000 nautical miles (4,600,000 km).

At dawn the lifeboats were scattered over an area of about 1 square mile (2.6 km^{2}). Shortly after 0800 hrs the cruiser HMS Achilles sighted them. An aircraft circled them, then at 1030 hrs a fast motor launch arrived whose crew told the lifeboat crews in which direction to steer. The lifeboats proceeded under sail until their occupants were rescued by "a large liner in the vicinity" that was diverted to the scene. Under conditions of wartime secrecy, news reports at the time did not disclose that it was Huddart Parker's 9,576 GRT Trans-Tasman liner Wanganella. The Northern Steamship Company coaster Kapiti and a number of launches transferred survivors from the lifeboats to Wanganella.

Niagara's only apparent fatality was her ship's cat, a five-year-old grey and white long-haired tom called Aussie. His mother had been Niagara's cat before him, his father was a Persian in Vancouver and Aussie was born at Suva. Aussie was put in one of the lifeboats when Niagara was being abandoned, but he jumped back aboard ship. A few days later, residents of Horahora, Whangarei claimed that a cat answering Aussie's description came ashore on a piece of driftwood, and that one of them had taken him in, but the cat escaped and had not been seen since.

== Gold salvage ==
The UK government urgently needed the gold to be salvaged from the wreck. This had been done before. In 1917 two German mines had sunk the armed merchant cruiser Laurentic off the coast of Ireland. She was carrying 3,211 gold bars, most of which were salvaged by Royal Navy divers between 1917 and 1924. The amount was more than 43 tons: five times as much as Niagara was carrying.

Nor was the depth unprecedented. in 1932 an Italian salvage contractor had recovered sovereigns and silver bullion worth £1 million from the wreck of the P&O liner Egypt in the English Channel. Egypt lay at a depth of 560 ft (170 m), which was even deeper than Niagara.

However, the depth at which Niagara lay was a great challenge, and it was in a minefield. Minesweepers disposed of three mines after Niagara was sunk, but no-one on the Allied side of the war knew how many Orion had laid.

=== 1941 ===
The Royal Australian Navy dismissed the idea of trying to salvage the gold. But the Bank of England offered a fee of £27,000 plus 2.5 per cent of the value of any gold recovered. A syndicate from Melbourne, Australia accepted the offer. Captain JP Williams, Captain J Herd and chief diver John Edwards Johnstone led the syndicate, which was called either the United Salvage Syndicate or United Salvage Proprietary Ltd.

An engineer from Melbourne, David Isaacs, designed a diving chamber for the salvagers. A company in Castlemaine variously referred to as Thompson's Engineering and Pipe Co or Thompson's Foundry made the chamber in conditions of strict wartime secrecy. It is made of manganese bronze, has several small quartz glass portholes, is built to withstand pressure to a depth of 125 fathoms (229 m) and weighs three tonnes. It is cylindrical, with a bulbous top, and just big enough for one man to stand inside.

The salvagers obtained the use of Claymore, a 260 GRT Northern Steamship Company coaster that had been built in 1902 and was now rusting in Auckland harbour. Her steam engine was unreliable, one of her propeller blades was missing and her hull constantly needed patching, but she seems to have been the only ship available.

Claymore was fitted out with the chamber and a grab to convert her into a salvage ship. The salvagers based themselves at Whangārei and began operations on 15 December 1940. Claymore searched for the wreck by dragging her anchor across the seabed. Twice she fouled mines that Orion had planted, and was fortunate not to be sunk. Once the diving chamber became fouled with the anchor wire of one of the mines. On 2 February 1941 Claymore found Niagara.

Niagara lies on her port side. The salvagers used explosives to try to blast open her hull, but with little success. Salvagers then used the grab to open the wreck bit by bit. One diver was lowered in the diving chamber to observe the grab, and passed instructions by telephone up to the grab operator aboard Claymore. The divers were John Johnstone and his brother William, who between them made 316 descents to the wreck. Eventually the operation exposed Niagara's strong room.

In October 1941 the salvage crew used explosives to open the strong room door. The first two gold bars were recovered on 13 October. By December 1941 they had recovered 555 of the 590 gold bars. The salvage operation was ended on 8 December, the day after the Japanese attack on Pearl Harbor.

The diving chamber was later returned to Castlemaine, possibly early in the 1980s. It is now preserved and displayed in the historic Castlemaine Market Building.

=== 1953 ===
In 1953 Johnstone returned with a different salvage ship and more modern equipment. Foremost 17 had been built in 1911 as Port of London Authority No. 9, a 583 GRT hopper barge for the Port of London Authority. In 1925 the PLA sold her and her new owner renamed her Foremost 17. She passed through several private owners, until in 1940 the Admiralty bought her and had her converted into a salvage ship. In June 1944 she was at Gold Beach where Mulberry Harbour B was built to supply the Allied invasion of Normandy. In 1947 the Admiralty sold her to a British Company, Risdon Beazley, and by about 1952 she was in Australia.

Foremost 17, like Claymore, was equipped with a diving chamber from which to direct work on the wreck. But instead of a grab, Foremost 17 had what Johnstone called the "iron man". This was described as having robotic arms and legs that could walk on the sea bed at depth, picking up heavy objects. It was operated directly from the diving chamber, instead of relying on an observer relaying instructions to an operator on the surface.

Foremost 17 found Niagara on 16 April 1953. By 23 July she had recovered 30 of the 35 remaining gold bars and Johnstone had ended the salvage operation. Five bars remain unaccounted for.

== The wreck since 1953 ==
A New Zealand law passed in 1979 protects an underwater communications cable that passes near the wreck. This law forbids any vessel anchoring above the wreck without special permission.

In 1988 marine salvage specialist Keith Gordon from Albany, New Zealand explored the wreck with a remotely operated underwater vehicle.

The wreck has become an artificial reef, rich with marine life. Since 1999 scuba divers have visited and explored it. Where the strong room used to be is now a crater littered with débris.

Gordon recovered Niagara's bell in 2007.

=== Environment ===
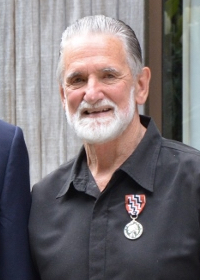
Wade Doak has described Niagara's wreck as an environmental "ticking timebomb"

Niagara's fuel oil capacity was 5,000 tons. Maritime New Zealand says it does not know how much oil remains in the wreck. News reports from the 2010s variously estimate the amount at 1,000 tonnes, 1,500 tonnes, or 4,200 tons (sic).

Oil has escaped from her wreck ever since she was sunk in 1940. In the 1980s Keith Gordon saw oil escaping from the wreck and forming a slick 8 nautical miles (15 km) long. Another escape was photographed in 2000, when marine environmentalist Wade Doak described the wreck as a "ticking timebomb", threatening Whangārei's mangrove systems and the Hen and Chickens Islands nature reserve. In 2015 she was described as "still bleeding oil".

Maritime NZ says that the remaining oil is in a semi-solid state because of the pressure and low temperature at that depth. But the wreck is deteriorating, and climate change is increasing the sea temperature. A new contingency plan was made in 2016 in case a large amount of oil suddenly escapes.

Environmentalists including Doak, salvage experts, and Auckland politician Mike Lee have called for the oil to be extracted from the wreck to prevent such a disaster. In 2017 Gordon estimated that with modern technology, the oil could be extracted at a cost of about NZ$6 million. In 2018 an art exhibition was held in Mangawhai Heads to raise public awareness of the environmental threat from the wreck.

== Bibliography ==
- Denniston, JE; Mitchelson, E; McLaren, D (1919). Influenza Epidemic Commission (report of the). Wellington: Marcus F Marks – via AtoJs online.
- Dunn, RJ; Johnstone, J (1942). Niagara Gold: The romantic story of sunken treasure retrieved from record ocean depths, New Zealand. AH & AW Reed.
- Gordon, Keith (2005). Deep Water Gold: the story of RMS Niagara – the quest for New Zealand's greatest shipwreck treasure. Whangārei: SeaROV Technologies. ISBN 0-473-10056-8.
- Ingram, CWN (1972) [1936]. New Zealand Shipwrecks 1795–1970 (4 ed.). Wellington: Reed. pp. 372–373. ISBN 0-589-00715-7.
- The Marconi Press Agency Ltd (1914). The Year Book of Wireless Telegraphy and Telephony. London: The Marconi Press Agency Ltd.
- Maynard, Jeff (1996). Niagara's Gold: how an Australian and New Zealand team salvaged eight tons of gold from a German minefield. Kenthurst: Kangaroo Press. ISBN 978-0864177667.
- Taylor, James (1943). Gold from the Sea. London: George G. Harrap and Co.
- Waters, Sydney D (1951). Union Line A Short History of the Union Steam Ship Company of New Zealand Limited 1875–1951.
- Wilson, RM (1956). The Big Ships. London: Cassell & Co.
