= SS Flying Enterprise =

Shipwreck in Cornwall

- Still from newsreel footage of SS Flying Enterprise when she was sinking, 10 January 1952

History
- Name: 1944: SS Cape Kumukaki; 1947: SS Flying Enterprise
- Owner: 1944: War Shipping Administration; 1947: Isbrandtsen Company
- Port of registry: 1944: (United States) Los Angeles; 1947: New York
- Builder: Consolidated Steel Corporation, Wilmington, California
- Yard number: 360
- Launched: 7 January 1944
- Completed: March 1944
- In service: 18 March 1944
- Identification: Official number 215133; Code letters KWFZ
- Fate: Sank 10 January 1952

General characteristics
- Type: Type C1-B ship
- Tonnage: 6,711 GRT
- Length: 396 ft 5 in (120.83 m), pp
- Beam: 60 ft 1 in (18.31 m)
- Height: 25 ft 8 in (7.82 m)
- Propulsion: 2 x Westinghouse Electric & Manufacturing Co steam turbines, double reduction geared driving one screw. 4,000 hp (3,000 kW)
- Speed: 14 knots (26 km/h)
- Crew: 48, plus 10 passengers

SS Flying Enterprise was a 6,711 ton Type C1-B ship which sank off Cornwall in 1952. She was built in 1944 as SS Cape Kumukaki for the United States Maritime Commission for use in World War II. The ship was sold in 1947 and operated in scheduled service under the name Flying Enterprise. At the end of 1951, on a voyage from Hamburg to the US with mixed cargo and a few passengers, she was crippled by storm damage and shifting cargo. Passengers and crew were evacuated. Three weeks of effort to save the ship having failed, she sank in January and some of the cargo was later salvaged.

== History ==
Cape Kumukaki was built by Consolidated Steel Corporation of Wilmington, California and launched on 7 January 1944. Delivered on 18 March 1944, she was owned by the United States War Shipping Administration and registered at Los Angeles.

After the end of World War II, she was sold in 1947 to the Isbrandtsen Company. At this time, her name was changed to the Flying Enterprise and re-registered in New York. For the next five years, she was used as a general cargo freighter in the North Atlantic.

On 21 December 1951, under the command of Henrik Kurt Carlsen, she left Hamburg, Germany bound for the USA. Among her cargo was 1,270 long tons (1,290 t) of pig iron and 486 long tons (494 t) of coffee, 447 long tons (454 t) rags, 39 long tons (40 t) peat moss, twelve Volkswagen cars, antiques and antique musical instruments, typewriters, 447 long tons (454 t) of naphthalene as well as ten passengers. There is speculation that the cargo also included gold and zirconium.

Four days later, on Christmas night, she encountered a storm in the Western Approaches to the English Channel. Afterwards, it was discovered that she had suffered structural damage and a crack was found across the weather deck from a rogue wave. The cargo then shifted. An SOS was issued on 28 December, by which time she was listing 45 degrees to port. British flagged vessel MV Sherborne and USNS General A. W. Greely responded, Sherborne being first to arrive, early in the morning of 29 December. Carlsen, however, was reluctant to evacuate passengers and crew to a British ship. Sherborne was asked to remain on station in case the situation deteriorated before an American ship arrived. The situation did deteriorate, just as USNS General A W Greely arrived mid-afternoon and both ships sent lifeboats to pick up passengers and crew. The crew and passengers were evacuated with the loss of one life (a male passenger). Among the rescued passengers was 11-year-old Lothar Muller, who was saved by crew member Robert Lumpkins. Lumpkins swam with the boy from the stricken ship to the rescue vessel Southland; contemporary reports noted that he later developed pneumonia from exposure. Captain Carlsen remained on board. After passengers and crew had been evacuated, MV Sherborne was released and continued her voyage to Manchester.

By 2 January 1952, the USS John W. Weeks had arrived and relieved the merchant ships. The following day, the tug Turmoil arrived, guided by the searchlights from USS John W Weeks, but found it impossible to take the Flying Enterprise in tow. The tug's mate, Kenneth Dancy, was then transferred to the Flying Enterprise on 4 January, by which time the list had increased to 60 degrees. The ship was taken in tow on 5 January, when she was some 300 nautical miles (560 km) from Falmouth, Cornwall. On 6 January, USS Willard Keith relieved the John W Weeks and the French tug Abeille 25 also joined the rescue effort. The tow line parted at 01:30 on 10 January, with Flying Enterprise 31 nautical miles (57 km) south of The Lizard and 41 nautical miles (76 km) from Falmouth. Later that day, the Turmoil was joined by the Trinity House vessel Satellite and the tugs Dexterous and Englishman. Carlsen and Dancy finally abandoned ship at 15:22 hrs and were picked up by Turmoil. The Flying Enterprise capsized and sank, stern first, at 16:10 hrs to whistle, siren and foghorn salutes from the flotilla.

The salvage attempts were criticised as the ship might have been saved by heading for the nearest safe harbour, Cork, rather than Falmouth.

A public house in Cork, Ireland is named the "Flying Enterprise" after the ship.

== Salvage ==
In 1960, some $210,000 of the $800,000-worth of cargo was salvaged from Flying Enterprise by the Italian company Sorima. Under a confidentiality clause in the salvage contract, further details of the recovered cargo were not released.

In 1976 author Bjarne Bekker published "Flying Enterprise & Kurt Carlsen" that told the life story of Carlsen and his efforts to save the Flying Enterprise. Carlsen was buried at sea at the Flying Enterprise's final resting place on 8 February 1990 after a journey to Japan in a safety box on SS Jutlandia.

== Wreck discovery and diving ==
In June 2001 British technical divers, rediscovered the lost shipwreck of Flying Enterprise almost 50 years after she had sunk. Deep wreck diver Leigh Bishop had researched the whereabouts of the sinking and obtained information from British government departments on the wreck's approximate location. His photographs were enough to positively identify the wreck as that of the Flying Enterprise.

In 2002 the Danish expedition company No Limit Diving and the Danish filmmaker Lasse Spang Olsen aired a documentary, The Mystery of Flying Enterprise, to commemorate the 50th year of the sinking.

Later Bishop worked with US divers John Chatterton and Richie Kohler to film the wreck for a 2005 episode of the History Channel's Deep Sea Detectives. This became the deepest wreck dived of the 56 episodes made.

The wreck now lies resting on her port side in a depth of 84 metres (276 ft) on the seabed of the western approaches to the English Channel. Bishop recovered artifacts which, for many years, were on display in the Cornish Maritime Museum.

== Speculation into the sinking and cargo ==
Speculations about a shipment of zirconium, intended for use in the first nuclear submarine USS Nautilus (SSN-571), but registered as pig iron, were discussed in a 2002 Danish television documentary Det Skæve skib (English title: The Mystery of Flying Enterprise).

According to this documentary, information regarding the cargo is still (in the year 2002) regarded as confidential and details are not available from the CIA, FIA, Coast Guard and/or US Navy. On the other hand, there appears to have been no secret that the US Atomic Energy Commission was acquiring zirconium, so it is not clear why any of these organizations should actually have information related to the Flying Enterprise. In the interview with Bekker, Carlsen tells him that yes the ship had a zirconium cargo and that it came from the German nuclear energy project. While there seems to be no reason to doubt the first statement, the origin of the zirconium is questionable as the German nuclear energy program was not very advanced. It has been speculated that the zirconium instead came from Philips in Eindhoven, the company that had the first patent on a process to obtain high purity zirconium, and that the buyer was one of the companies intending to bid for a contract with the US Atomic Energy Commission.

Hammond Innes fictionalized the story with "The Wreck of the Mary Deare" published in 1956, about a decrepit and drifting freighter found by a salvager. A movie by the same name was made in 1959 and featured Gary Cooper and Charlton Heston.

== Passengers and cargo ==
The passengers on board Flying Enterprise were Nicolai Bunjakowski, Nina Dannheiser, Maria Duttenhofer, Rolf Kastenholz, Leonore von Klenau, Curt and Elsa Müller and their children Liane and Lothar, and Frederick Niederbrüning. All survived except Bunjakowski, who drowned during the rescue.

An exceptionally rare violin by Vincenzo Rugeri was lost to the sea when the ship sank.

== Honours ==
Captain Carlsen was awarded a Lloyd's Silver Medal for Meritorious Service in recognition of his efforts to save Flying Enterprise, and received a ticker-tape parade in New York City on January 17, 1952.

Kenneth Dancy was awarded the Order of Industrial Heroism medal by the Daily Herald newspaper and an illuminated citation from the American Institute of Marine Underwriters. He died on 3 August 2013, aged 88.

In addition, the ship's owners made payments in respect of the bravery of the Turmoil's crew – £750 to Captain Parker, £500 to Dancy and £1,250 to be distributed among the 26 crew; the gifts presented by US Ambassador Walter Sherman Gifford
