= USS General A. W. Greely =

1945 US transport ship

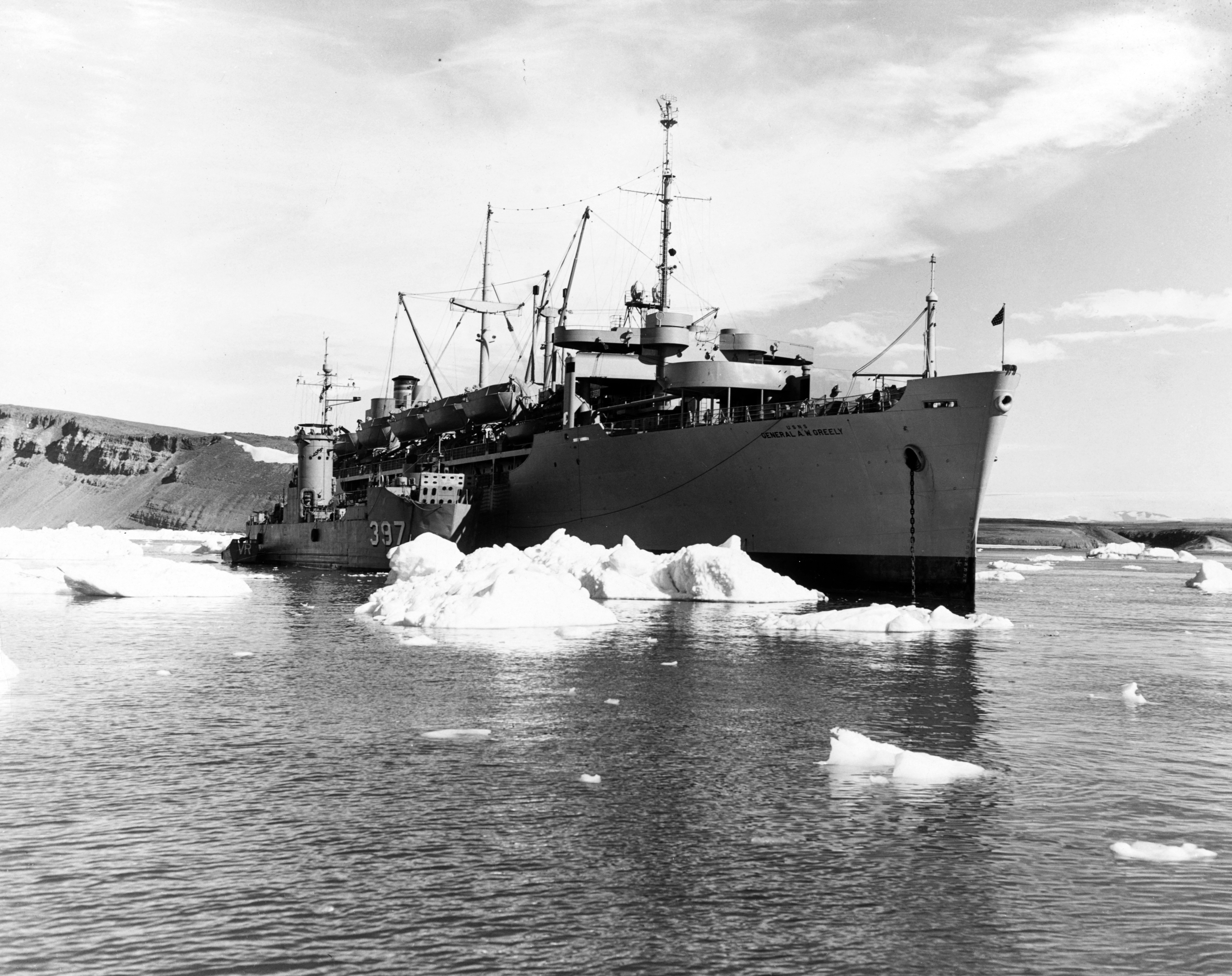
- USNS General A.W. Greely alongside the USS LSM-397

History

United States
- Name: General A.W. Greely
- Namesake: Adolphus Washington Greely
- Builder: Kaiser Co., Inc.; Richmond, California
- Laid down: 18 July 1944
- Launched: 5 November 1944
- Acquired: 22 March 1945 as AP-141
- Commissioned: 22 March 1945
- Decommissioned: 29 March 1946
- Renamed: USAT General A. W. Greely, 29 March 1946; USNS General A. W. Greely, 1 March 1950; SS Hawaii Bear, 1969; SS Austral Glade, 1975; SS Pacific Enterprise, 1979; SS Caribe Enterprise, 1982
- Reclassified: T-AP-141, 29 March 1946
- Reinstated: 1 March 1950
- Identification: IMO number: 6904791
- Fate: Sold for commercial use, scrapped 1986

General characteristics
- Class & type: General G. O. Squier-class transport ship
- Displacement: 9,950 tons (light), 17,250 tons (full)
- Length: 522 ft 10 in (159.36 m)
- Beam: 71 ft 6 in (21.79 m)
- Draft: 26 ft 6 in (8.10 m)
- Propulsion: single-screw steam turbine with 9,900 shp (7,400 kW)
- Speed: 17 knots (31 km/h)
- Capacity: 3,823 troops
- Complement: 356 (officers and enlisted)
- Armament: 4 × 5"/38 caliber gun mounts; 4 × 40 mm Bofors AA gun mounts; 16 × 20 mm Oerlikon AA gun mounts

USS General A. W. Greely (AP-141) was a General G. O. Squier-class transport ship named for U.S. Army general Adolphus Greely. She was transferred to the U.S. Army as USAT General A. W. Greeley in 1946. On 1 March 1950 she was transferred to the Military Sea Transportation Service (MSTS) as USNS General A. W. Greely (T-AP-141). She was later sold and converted to a container ship and operated under several names before being scrapped in 1986.

== Operational history ==
The Greely was a Type C4 transport, laid down under Maritime Commission contract 18 July 1944 by Kaiser Co., Inc., Yard 3, Richmond, California; launched 5 November 1944; sponsored by Mrs. Clarke Wayland; acquired by the navy 22 March 1945; and commissioned the same day.

After shakedown, General A. W. Greely embarked 2,923 troops and civilians and departed San Pedro, Los Angeles, 16 April for Australia. She reached Melbourne, 4 May, then sailed the next day for Fremantle and India, arriving Calcutta, 20 May. After embarking homebound troops, she departed 28 May; steamed via Ceylon and Suez; and arrived Newport News, Virginia on 22 June. From 28 June to 7 July she sailed to Le Havre, France, where she embarked 3,000 troops before returning to New York, NY on 18 July. Between 28 July and 6 December she completed two round-trip voyages from New York to Calcutta, transporting occupation troops, mail, and cargo; and returning home-bound veterans to the United States.

Departing New York 14 December, she reached Karachi, India, 4 January 1946 and embarked additional returning veterans. She sailed 6 January for the West Coast; and, steaming via Ceylon, Singapore, and the Philippines, she arrived Seattle, Washington, 2 February. She decommissioned at San Francisco, California, 29 March and was transferred to WSA the same day for use as a transport in the Army Transportation Service, as USAT General A. W. Greely. Part of this transportation service involved the immigration of displaced persons from Europe to the United States and Australia.

Reacquired by the navy 1 March 1950, the ship was assigned to Military Sea Transportation Service under a civilian crew and her designation was changed to USNS General A. W. Greely (T-AP-141). She departed Seattle 5 August and carried troops to the Far East in support of the effort to repel Communist expansion in Korea. Operating out of Seattle, during the next nine months she made four round-trip voyages to Japan, Korea, and Okinawa. Returning to Seattle 3 May 1951, she then sailed 24 May for duty in the Atlantic.

Operating out of New York, between 10 October 1951 and 22 February 1953 General A. W. Greely completed numerous transatlantic runs to Bremerhaven, Germany, and La Pallice, France. While en route from Bremerhaven in January 1952, she rescued survivors from the stricken merchantman SS Flying Enterprise.

Placed in reduced operational status from 17 April until 5 June 1953, she departed Norfolk 16 June for Thule, Greenland. Arriving on 3 July, she served until 30 September as barracks ship during Operation "Blue Jay," the construction of Thule Air Force Base. She returned to New York 9 October; steamed to Bremerhaven and back between 10 November and 4 December; and was again placed in reduced operational status from 9 December until 19 July 1954.

General A. W. Greely departed New York 27 July, bound for the Pacific. Arriving San Francisco 11 August, she sailed for the Far East 7 September and operated in Korean and Japanese waters before returning to San Francisco via Adak, Alaska, 10 October. She steamed to Portland, Oregon, 27 October; entered the Pacific Reserve Fleet at San Diego in March 1955; and was transferred to the National Defense Reserve Fleet at Olympia, Washington, 29 August 1959.

After being laid up in the reserve fleets for well over a decade, General A.W. Greely was sold for commercial use in 1968 to Pacific Far East Line (PFEL), converted to a container ship, and renamed SS Hawaii Bear, USCG ON 513675, IMO 6904791. In 1975 she was sold to Farrell Lines and renamed SS Austral Glade. Sold again in 1979 to American Pacific Container Line, she was renamed SS Pacific Enterprise, and then SS Caribe Enterprise in 1982. She was sold for scrapping in 1986.

== Sources ==
- Williams, Greg H. (2013). World War II U.S. Navy Vessels in Private Hands. McFarland Books. ISBN 978-0-7864-6645-0.
