= Imperial Shipping Committee =

British government advisory board on shipping

The Imperial Shipping Committee and later the Commonwealth Shipping Committee was an advisory body founded by the British government following the First World War to monitor and coordinate coordinate shipping throughout the empire.

The committee was established in 1920, with Halford Mackinder serving as its first chair until 1937. Under his tenure the committee would meet 233 times publishing 39 reports. It would become the Commonwealth Shipping Committee in 1948 and continue to function until 1963.

The committee was largely created in response to criticisms among British dominions on the state of imperial shipping services. The body therefore aimed to represent the governments of both the dominions and metropole equally in matters of shipping despite the asymmetries of shipping industries between them, and acted as a sort of intermediary imperial body. The Imperial Economic Conference of 1923 praised the creation of the committee in two resolutions, with similar sentiment being echoed in those following. Despite this the body would generally be dominated by British interests and considered by many of the dominions to be causing issues in their own commercial industries, among them Canada would be the most resistant.
