= List of United States Navy Landing Ship Mediums =

This is a list of Landing Ship Medium (LSMs) built by the United States Navy.

== List of LSM-1-class ships ==
- USS LSM-1
- USS LSM-2
- USS LSM-3
- USS LSM-4
- USS LSM-5
- USS LSM-6
- USS LSM-7
- USS LSM-8
- USS LSM-9
- USS LSM-10
- USS LSM-11
- USS LSM-12
- USS LSM-13
- USS LSM-14
- USS LSM-15
- USS LSM-16
- USS LSM-17
- USS LSM-18
- USS LSM-19
- USS LSM-20
- USS LSM-21
- USS LSM-22
- USS LSM-23
- USS LSM-24
- USS LSM-25
- USS LSM-26
- USS LSM-27
- USS LSM-28
- USS LSM-29
- USS LSM-30
- USS LSM-31
- USS LSM-32
- USS LSM-33
- USS LSM-34
- USS LSM-35
- USS LSM-36
- USS LSM-37
- USS LSM-38
- USS LSM-39
- USS LSM-40
- USS LSM-41
- USS LSM-42
- USS LSM-43
- USS LSM-44
- USS LSM-45
- USS LSM-46
- USS LSM-47
- USS LSM-48
- USS LSM-49
- USS LSM-50
- USS LSM-51
- USS LSM-52
- USS LSM-53
- USS LSM-54
- USS LSM-55
- USS LSM-56
- USS LSM-57
- USS LSM-58
- USS LSM-59
- USS LSM-60, Operation Crossroads nuclear test ship, first naval ship to deploy a nuclear device, destroyed
- USS LSM-61
- USS LSM-62
- USS LSM-63
- USS LSM-64
- USS LSM-65
- USS LSM-66
- USS LSM-67
- USS LSM-68
- USS LSM-69
- USS LSM-70
- USS LSM-71
- USS LSM-72
- USS LSM-73
- USS LSM-74
- USS LSM-75
- USS LSM-76
- USS LSM-77
- USS LSM-78
- USS LSM-79
- USS LSM-80
- USS LSM-81
- USS LSM-82
- USS LSM-83
- USS LSM-84
- USS LSM-85
- USS LSM-86
- USS LSM-87
- USS LSM-88
- USS LSM-89
- USS LSM-90
- USS LSM-91
- USS LSM-92
- USS LSM-93
- USS LSM-94
- USS LSM-95
- USS LSM-96
- USS LSM-97
- USS LSM-98
- USS LSM-99
- USS LSM-100
- USS LSM-101
- USS LSM-102
- USS LSM-103
- USS LSM-104
- USS LSM-105
- USS LSM-106
- USS LSM-107
- USS LSM-108
- USS LSM-109
- USS LSM-110
- USS LSM-111
- USS LSM-112
- USS LSM-113
- USS LSM-114
- USS LSM-115
- USS LSM-116
- USS LSM-117
- USS LSM-118
- USS LSM-119
- USS LSM-120
- USS LSM-121
- USS LSM-122
- USS LSM-123
- USS LSM-124
- USS LSM-125
- USS LSM-126
- USS LSM-127
- USS LSM-128
- USS LSM-129
- USS LSM-130
- USS LSM-131
- USS LSM-132
- USS LSM-133
- USS LSM-134
- USS LSM-135
- USS LSM-136
- USS LSM-137
- USS LSM-138
- USS LSM-139
- USS LSM-140
- USS LSM-141
- USS LSM-142
- USS LSM-143
- USS LSM-144
- USS LSM-145
- USS LSM-146
- USS LSM-147
- USS LSM-148
- USS LSM-149
- USS LSM-150
- USS LSM-151
- USS LSM-152
- USS LSM-153
- USS LSM-154
- USS LSM-155
- USS LSM-156
- USS LSM-157
- USS LSM-158
- USS LSM-159
- USS LSM-160
- USS Kodiak (LSM-161)
- USS LSM-162
- USS LSM-163
- USS LSM-164
- USS LSM-165
- USS LSM-166
- USS LSM-167
- USS LSM-168
- USS LSM-169
- USS LSM-170
- USS LSM-171
- USS LSM-172
- USS LSM-173
- USS LSM-174
- USS Oceanside (LSM-175)
- USS LSM-176
- USS LSM-177
- USS LSM-178
- USS LSM-179
- USS LSM-180
- USS LSM-181
- USS LSM-182
- USS LSM-183
- USS LSM-184
- USS LSM-185
- USS LSM-186
- USS LSM-187
- USS LSM-200
- USS LSM-201
- USS LSM-202
- USS LSM-203
- USS LSM-204
- USS LSM-205
- USS LSM-206
- USS LSM-207
- USS LSM-208
- USS LSM-209
- USS LSM-210
- USS LSM-211
- USS LSM-212
- USS LSM-213
- USS LSM-214
- USS LSM-215
- USS LSM-216
- USS LSM-217
- USS LSM-218
- USS LSM-219
- USS LSM-220
- USS LSM-221
- USS LSM-222
- USS LSM-223
- USS LSM-224
- USS LSM-225
- USS LSM-226
- USS LSM-227
- USS LSM-228
- USS LSM-229
- USS LSM-230
- USS LSM-231
- USS LSM-236
- USS LSM-237
- USS LSM-238
- USS LSM-239
- USS LSM-240
- USS LSM-241
- USS LSM-242
- USS LSM-243
- USS LSM-244
- USS LSM-245
- USS LSM-246
- USS LSM-247
- USS LSM-248
- USS LSM-249
- USS LSM-250
- USS LSM-251
- USS LSM-252
- USS LSM-253
- USS LSM-254
- USS LSM-255
- USS LSM-256
- USS LSM-257
- USS LSM-258
- USS LSM-259
- USS LSM-260
- USS LSM-261
- USS LSM-262
- USS LSM-263
- USS LSM-264
- USS LSM-265
- USS LSM-266
- USS LSM-267
- USS LSM-268
- USS LSM-269
- USS LSM-270
- USS LSM-271
- USS LSM-272
- USS LSM-273
- USS LSM-274
- USS Portunus (LSM-275), later reclassified as a cable repair ship (ARC-1)
- USS LSM-276
- USS LSM-277
- USS LSM-278
- USS LSM-279
- USS LSM-280
- USS LSM-281
- USS LSM-282
- USS LSM-283
- USS LSM-284
- USS LSM-285
- USS LSM-286
- USS LSM-287
- USS LSM-288
- USS LSM-289
- USS LSM-290
- USS LSM-291
- USS LSM-292
- USS LSM-293
- USS LSM-294
- USS LSM-295
- USS LSM-296
- USS LSM-297
- USS LSM-298
- USS LSM-299
- USS LSM-300
- USS LSM-301, later reclassified as a coastal minelayer (MMC-6)
- USS LSM-302
- USS LSM-303, later reclassified as a coastal minelayer (MMC-7)
- USS LSM-304
- USS LSM-305
- USS LSM-306
- USS LSM-307
- USS LSM-308
- USS LSM-309
- USS LSM-310
- USS LSM-311
- USS LSM-312
- USS LSM-313
- USS LSM-314
- USS LSM-315
- USS LSM-316
- USS LSM-317
- USS LSM-318
- USS LSM-319
- USS LSM-320
- USS LSM-321
- USS LSM-322
- USS LSM-323
- USS LSM-324
- USS LSM-325
- USS LSM-326
- USS LSM-327
- USS LSM-328
- USS LSM-329
- USS LSM-330
- USS LSM-331
- USS LSM-332
- USS LSM-333
- USS LSM-334
- USS LSM-335, later reclassified (T-AG-335)
- USS LSM-336
- USS LSM-337
- USS LSM-338
- USS LSM-339
- USS LSM-340
- USS LSM-341
- USS LSM-342
- USS LSM-343
- USS LSM-344
- USS LSM-345
- USS LSM-346
- USS LSM-347
- USS LSM-348
- USS LSM-349
- USS LSM-350
- USS LSM-351
- USS LSM-352
- USS LSM-353
- USS LSM-354
- USS LSM-355
- USS LSM-356
- USS LSM-357
- USS LSM-358
- USS LSM-359
- USS LSM-360
- USS LSM-361
- USS LSM-362
- USS LSM-363
- USS LSM-364
- USS LSM-365
- USS LSM-366
- USS LSM-367
- USS LSM-368
- USS LSM-369
- USS LSM-370
- USS LSM-371
- USS LSM-372
- USS Lakeland (LSM-373)
- USS LSM-374
- USS LSM-375
- USS LSM-376
- USS LSM-377
- USS LSM-378
- USS LSM-379
- USS LSM-380
- USS LSM-381
- USS LSM-382
- USS LSM-383
- USS LSM-384
- USS LSM-385
- USS LSM-386
- USS LSM-387
- USS LSM-388
- USS LSM-389
- USS LSM-390, later reclassified as a coastal minelayer (MMC-8)
- USS LSM-391
- USS LSM-392, later reclassified as a coastal minelayer (MMC-9)
- USS LSM-393
- USS LSM-394
- USS LSM-395
- USS LSM-396
- USS LSM-397
- USS Hunting (LSM-398), later reclassified as a sonar research vessel (E-AG-398)
- USS LSM-399
- USS LSM-400
- USS LSM-413
- USS LSM-414
- USS LSM-415
- USS LSM-416
- USS LSM-417
- USS LSM-418
- USS LSM-419
- USS LSM-420
- USS LSM-421
- USS LSM-422
- USS LSM-423
- USS LSM-424
- USS LSM-425
- USS LSM-426
- USS LSM-427
- USS LSM-428
- USS LSM-429
- USS LSM-430
- USS LSM-431
- USS LSM-432
- USS LSM-433
- USS LSM-434
- USS LSM-435
- USS LSM-436
- USS LSM-437
- USS LSM-438
- USS LSM-439
- USS LSM-440
- USS LSM-441
- USS LSM-442
- USS LSM-443
- USS LSM-444
- USS Catapult (LSM-445), later reclassified to a Drone aircraft catapult control craft (YV-1)
- USS Launcher (LSM-446), later reclassified (E-LSM-446) and again to (YV-2)
- USS LSM-447
- USS LSM-448
- USS LSM-449
- USS LSM-450
- USS LSM-451
- USS LSM-452
- USS LSM-453
- USS LSM-454
- USS LSM-455
- USS LSM-456
- USS LSM-457
- USS LSM-458
- USS LSM-459
- USS LSM-460
- USS LSM-461
- USS LSM-462
- USS LSM-463
- USS LSM-464
- USS LSM-465
- USS LSM-466
- USS LSM-467
- USS LSM-468
- USS LSM-469
- USS LSM-470
- USS LSM-471
- USS LSM-472
- USS LSM-473
- USS LSM-474
- USS LSM-475
- USS LSM-476
- USS LSM-477
- USS LSM-478
- USS LSM-479
- USS LSM-480
- USS LSM-481, later reclassified as a coastal minelayer (MMC-10)
- USS LSM-482
- USS LSM-483
- USS LSM-484, later reclassified as a coastal minelayer (MMC-11)
- USS LSM-485
- USS LSM-486
- USS LSM-487
- USS LSM-488
- USS LSM-489
- USS LSM-490, later reclassified as a coastal minelayer (MMC-12)
- USS LSM-491
- USS LSM-492, later reclassified as a coastal minelayer (MMC-13)
- USS LSM-493, later reclassified as a coastal minelayer (MMC-14)
- USS LSM-494
- USS LSM-495
- USS LSM-496
- USS LSM-497
- USS LSM-498
- USS LSM-499
- USS LSM-500
- USS LSM-537
- USS LSM-538
- USS LSM-539
- USS Raritan (LSM-540)
- USS LSM-541
- USS LSM-542
- USS LSM-543
- USS LSM-544
- USS LSM-545
- USS LSM-546
- USS LSM-547
- USS LSM-548
- USS LSM-553
- USS LSM-554
- USS LSM-555
- USS LSM-556
- USS LSM-557
- USS LSM-558

== List of LSM(R)-188-class ships ==
- USS LSM(R)-188
- USS LSM(R)-189
- USS LSM(R)-190
- USS LSM(R)-191
- USS LSM(R)-192
- USS LSM(R)-193
- USS LSM(R)-194
- USS LSM(R)-195
- USS LSM(R)-196
- USS LSM(R)-197
- USS LSM(R)-198
- USS LSM(R)-199

== List of LSM(R)-401-class ships ==
- USS Big Black River (LSM(R)-401), later reclassified (LFR-401)
- USS Big Horn River (LSM(R)-402)
- USS Blackstone River (LSM(R)-403)
- USS Black Warrior River (LSM(R)-404), later reclassified (LFR-404)
- USS Broadkill River (LSM(R)-405), later reclassified (LFR-405)
- USS Canadian River (LSM(R)-406)
- USS Chariton River (LSM(R)-407)
- USS Charles River (LSM(R)-408)
- USS Clarion River (LSM(R)-409), later reclassified (LFR-409)
- USS Clark Fork River (LSM(R)-410)
- USS Cumberland River (LSM(R)-411)
- USS Desplaines River (LSM(R)-412), later reclassified (LFR-412)

== List of LSM(R)-501-class ships ==
- USS Elk River (LSM(R)-501), later reclassified (IX-501)
- USS Escalante River (LSM(R)-502)
- USS Flambeau River (LSM(R)-503)
- USS Gila River (LSM(R)-504)
- USS Grand River (LSM(R)-505)
- USS Green River (LSM(R)-506)
- USS Greenbrier River (LSM(R)-507)
- USS Gunnison River (LSM(R)-508), later reclassified and renamed USS Targeteer (YV-3)
- USS Holston River (LSM(R)-509)
- USS James River (LSM(R)-510)
- USS John Day River (LSM(R)-511)
- USS Lamiolle River (LSM(R)-512), later reclassified (LFR-512)
- USS Laramie River (LSM(R)-513), later reclassified (LFR-513)
- USS Maurice River (LSM(R)-514)
- USS Owyhee River (LSM(R)-515), later reclassified (LFR-515)
- USS Pearl River (LSM(R)-516)
- USS Pee Dee River (LSM(R)-517)
- USS Pit River (LSM(R)-518)
- USS Powder River (LSM(R)-519)
- USS Raccoon River (LSM(R)-520)
- USS Rainy River (LSM(R)-521)
- USS Red River (LSM(R)-522), later reclassified (LFR-522)
- USS Republican River (LSM(R)-523)
- USS Saint Croix River (LSM(R)-524)
- USS St. Francis River (LSM(R)-525), later reclassified (LFR-525)
- USS St. Johns River (LSM(R)-526)
- USS St. Joseph's River (LSM(R)-527)
- USS St. Mary's River (LSM(R)-528)
- USS St. Regis River (LSM(R)-529)
- USS Salmon Falls River (LSM(R)-530)
- USS Smoky Hill River (LSM(R)-531), later reclassified (LFR-531)
- USS Smyrna River (LSM(R)-532)
- USS Snake River (LSM(R)-533)
- USS Thames River (LSM(R)-534)
- USS Trinity River (LSM(R)-535)
- USS White River (LSM(R)-536), later reclassified (LFR-536)

== List of Gypsy-class Salvage Lifting Vessels ==
- USS Gypsy (ARS(D)-1), ordered as LSM-549
- USS Mender (ARS(D)-2), ordered as LSM-550
- USS Salvager (ARS(D)-3), ordered as LSM-551, later reclassified as YMLC-3
- USS Windlass (ARS(D)-4), ordered as LSM-552, later reclassified as YMLC-4

== List of McClung-class Landing Ship Medium ==
- USS McClung (LSM-1)
