= LSM(R)-188-class landing ship medium =

Class of American medium landing ships

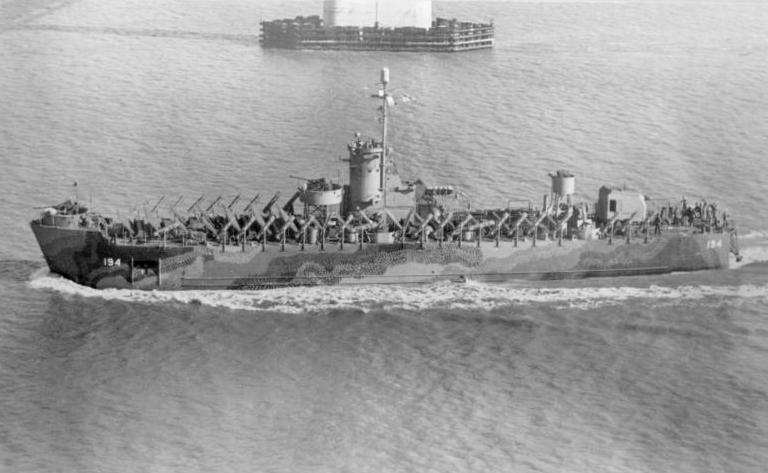
- USS LSM(R)-194, a LSM(R)-188-class ship

Class overview
- Name: Landing Ship Medium (Rocket)
- Builders: Charleston Navy Yard
- Operators: United States Navy
- Built: September–October 1944
- Completed: 12
- Lost: 3

General characteristics
- Displacement: 758 long tons (770 t) light; 983 long tons (999 t) attack; 1,175 long tons (1,194 t) fully loaded
- Length: 203 ft 6 in (62.03 m)
- Beam: 34 ft (10 m)
- Draft: 5 ft 4 in (1.63 m) light; 5 ft 8 in (1.73 m) attack; 7 ft 9 in (2.36 m) fully loaded
- Propulsion: 2 × General Motors Cleveland diesels, 2,800 shp (2,088 kW), 2 screws
- Speed: 13.2 knots (24.4 km/h; 15.2 mph)
- Range: 5,000 nmi (9,300 km) at 7 kn (13 km/h; 8.1 mph)
- Complement: 5 officers, 76 enlisted
- Armament: 1 × 5"/38 caliber gun; 2 × Bofors 40 mm guns; 3 × Oerlikon 20 mm cannon; 75 × four-rail Mark 36 automatic rocket launchers on topside rocket deck; 30 × 6-rail Mark 30 launchers mounted along gunwales (Removed early April 1945)

The LSM(R)-188 class was a class of twelve Landing Ship Medium (Rocket) of the United States Navy during World War II. They were used in the Pacific War for bombardment of shore positions.

== Development ==
The Landing Ship Medium (Rocket) was a development of the Landing Ship Medium for providing supporting fire to amphibious operations.

The LSM was one of a type of amphibious warfare ships alongside the Landing Ship Tank and Landing Ship Infantry. In the Normandy landings of 1944, some of the larger landing craft had been fitted with artillery, ship guns and rockets (e.g. LCI(R) ) to aid the bombardment of the German defences. A British LCT(R) could deliver 1,000 3-inch rockets in single firing onto the beaches - said to be the firepower of 80 cruisers.

In 1944 the US Navy Bureau of Ordnance fitted LSM with a 5-inch/38 gun and rockets to give landing troop fire support out to 4,000 yards beyond the beach. This armament gave it the ability to interdict, harass, and destroy the enemy. The high trajectory of the firepower meant it was effective against defences otherwise protected by their position on the reverse slope

The LSM(R) was featured in Life Magazine of 16 April 1945 with a centerfold picture and the caption. "Each of these tiny ships had amazing firepower, greater at short range than the combined firepower of two mammoth Iowa class battleships".

All ships of the class carried a single 5 in (130 mm) gun in a turret at the rear of the ship. Two 40 mm Bofors guns were carried; a single mount at the bow and another amidships in front of the bridge. In addition, three Oerlikon 20 mm cannon were carried in single mounts. The main armament was the rocket launchers. No. 188 to 195 had 75 four-rail Mark 36 rocket launchers and a further 30 six-rail Mark 30 Rocket Launchers, the latter were removed in early April 1945. The others had 85 Mark 51 automatic rocket launchers.

== Service ==
The interim group of 12 LSM(R)s crossed to the Pacific through the Panama Canal and on to the Philippines, headed for battle against Japan in March 1945.

In a preliminary assault on 26 March 1945, they laid down a rocket barrage at dawn on Kerama Retto, a small cluster of islands off the southwestern shore of Okinawa, to allow US Army troops of the 77th Infantry Division to land and secure the islands and the harbor for protection of the hospital, supply and communication ships, and floating drydocks. The early dawn assault surprised the Japanese; the army took control with a minimum of casualties and established a haven for damaged ships.

On the night of 28 March, Japanese planes from Okinawa airfields made a special attack on the small patrol craft assembled between the islands and Okinawa. About a dozen were shot down, but one crashed into LSM(R)-188. There were 15 men killed and another 32 wounded. The badly damaged ship survived, but she was sent back to Pearl Harbor and saw no further combat.

The Kerama Retto islands were a small chain of islands 15 miles west of the southwest tip of Okinawa. The invasion of the Kerma Retto was an opportunity for a first combat test of the 188-class LSM(R)s. The Japanese Sea Raiding Units had suicide boats based there, and on the morning of 29 March three of these boats attacked the LSM(R)-189 but were promptly destroyed. The northern half of the six-mile-wide invasion beach was assigned to Task Force 53, under the command of Rear Admiral Lawrence F. Reifsnider. The LSM(R)'s involved in the invasion on 1 April 1945 as part of the Northern Tractor Flotilla included LSM(R)-194,LSM(R)-195, LSM(R)-196, LSM(R)-197, LSM(R)-198, and LSM(R)-199. The southern half of the six-mile-wide invasion beach was assigned to Task Force 55, commanded by Rear Admiral John Leslie Hall Jr. The assault troops were under Major General John R. Hodge. The southern support craft included LSM(R)-189, LSM(R)-190, LSM(R)-191, LSM(R)-192, and LSM(R)-193.

=== Okinawa picket duty ===
During the battle for Okinawa, the plan for defense against the kamikazes (which would be targeting the fleet anchored off Okinawa and the Allied forces and supply dumps ashore) was to have fighters intercept the Japanese aircraft as early as possible. To this end 16 radar picket stations were established around the island, in some cases almost 100 miles out. Each station was manned around the clock by a handful of ships ranging from destroyers down to minesweepers and their task was to sound the alarm and vector fighters to intercept before they reached the fleet. However the kamikazes also made targets of the picket ships. The LSM(R)s were not suited for picket duty. They did not have aircraft tracking radar and their guns lacked adequate anti-aircraft director controllers making them poor at the job of anti-aircraft defence. Added to this they were laden with highly explosive rockets making them more vulnerable in case of damage. Most importantly they were specialist craft in short supply while other vessels were available for the picket duty. Their flotilla commander recommended they be withdrawn from the picket lines.

On 3 May 1945 the Japanese launched their fifth Kikusui attack. Picket station 10 was the hardest hit. Shortly before dusk, the destroyer Aaron Ward was hit by a series of six kamikazes, suffering 45 killed or missing and 49 wounded. The ship survived, but was later decommissioned because it was not worth repairing. About the same time, approximately 20 planes attacked the destroyer Little. She was crashed by four of them and sank within 12 minutes of the first hit. She lost 30 dead or missing and 79 wounded. The LSM(R)-195 was also on Picket Station 10 and while rushing to the aid of the Aaron Ward and the Little was likewise crashed by a kamikaze. The crash started her rockets exploding and knocked out the fire main and auxiliary pumps. LSM(R)-195 had to be abandoned and, after being ripped by heavy explosions, sank. The following day, 4 May, LSM(R)-190 was patrolling at Picket Station 12. Not long after sunrise the anticipated kamikazes arrived and were met by American combat air patrol. Several of the Japanese planes managed to get through. Three kamikazes crashed into LSM(R)-190 and she was sunk along with the destroyer Luce. At the same time, LSM(R)-194 suffered the same fate at Picket Station 1.

== Ships ==
Ship	Launched	Notes
USS LSM(R)-188	12 September 1944	Sold for scrap, 17 February 1948
USS LSM(R)-189	12 September 1944	Sold for scrap, 17 February 1948
USS LSM(R)-190	21 September 1944	Sunk, 4 May 1945
USS LSM(R)-191	21 September 1944	Sold, 20 January 1948
USS LSM(R)-192	4 October 1944	Sold, 10 March 1948
USS LSM(R)-193	4 October 1944	Sold, 20 January 1948
USS LSM(R)-194	7 October 1944	Sunk, 4 May 1945
USS LSM(R)-195	7 October 1944	Sunk, 3 May 1945
USS LSM(R)-196	12 October 1944	Sold, 11 September 1947
USS LSM(R)-197	12 October 1944	Sold, 3 February 1948
USS LSM(R)-198	14 October 1944	Sold for scrap, 18 February 1948
USS LSM(R)-199	14 October 1944	Sold, 10 March 1948
