= USS LSM(R)-188 =

1944 LSM(R)-188-class Landing Ship Medium

History

United States
- Name: USS LSM(R)-188
- Builder: Charleston Navy Yard, Charleston, South Carolina
- Laid down: 18 August 1944
- Launched: 12 September 1944
- Commissioned: 15 November 1944
- Decommissioned: 23 June 1946
- Fate: Sold for scrapping, 17 February 1948

General characteristics
- Class & type: LSM(R)-188-class Landing Ship Medium (Rocket)
- Displacement: 758 long tons (770 t) light; 983 long tons (999 t) attack; 1,175 long tons (1,194 t) fully loaded
- Length: 203 ft 6 in (62.03 m)
- Beam: 34 ft (10 m)
- Draft: 5 ft 4 in (1.63 m) light; 5 ft 8 in (1.73 m) attack; 7 ft 9 in (2.36 m) fully loaded
- Propulsion: 2 × General Motors Cleveland diesels, 2,800 shp (2,088 kW), 2 screws
- Speed: 13.2 knots (24.4 km/h; 15.2 mph)
- Range: 5,000 nmi (9,300 km) at 7 kn (13 km/h; 8.1 mph)
- Complement: 5 officers, 76 enlisted
- Armament: 1 × 5-inch/38-caliber gun; 2 × 40 mm guns; 3 × 20 mm guns; 75 × four-rail Mark 36 automatic rocket launchers on topside rocket deck; 30 × 6-rail Mark 30 launchers mounted along gunwales (Removed early April 1945)

Service record
- Operations: Battle of Okinawa
- Awards: 1 battle star; Navy Unit Commendation

USS LSM(R)-188 was the lead ship of her class of twelve Landing Ship Medium (Rocket) of the United States Navy during World War II. The ship took part in the Battle of Okinawa.

The interim group of 12 LSM(R)s transited the Panama Canal via San Diego, Honolulu, and the Philippines, headed for battle against Japan in March 1945. Unaware of their destination, the crews were nonetheless well equipped and trained. In a preliminary assault on 26 March 1945, they laid down a rocket barrage at dawn on Kerama Retto Island Group, a small cluster of islands off the southwestern shore of Okinawa, Japan. This allowed the US Marines to land and control the islands and the harbor for the protection of the hospital, floating dry dock, and supply and communication ships. The early dawn assault surprised the Japanese; the Marines took control with minimal casualties and established this haven for damaged ships.

== Service history ==
During World War II LSM(R) 188 was assigned to the Asiatic Pacific theater. At that time, the fleet was under the command of Admiral Spruance and named the Fifth fleet. Vice Admiral Richmond Kelly Turner was Commander of Amphibious Forces Pacific and was to be in charge of operations until the beachhead was established. The Kerama Retto islands were a small chain of islands 15 miles west of the southwest tip of Okinawa. The invasion of the Kerama Retto was an opportunity to break in all twelve of the 188-class LSM(R)s. One of the reasons that Admiral Turner wanted to capture Kerama Retto was his knowledge that the Japanese Sea Raiding Units had suicide boats hidden there. On the morning of 29 March, three of these boats attacked the LSM(R)-189 but were promptly destroyed. The northern half of the six-mile-wide invasion beach was assigned to Task Force 53, under the command of Rear Admiral Lawrence F. Reifsnider. The LSMRs involved in the invasion on 1 April 1945 as part of the Northern Tractor Flotilla included LSM(R)-194, LSM(R)-195, LSM(R)-196, LSM(R)-197, LSM(R)-198, and LSM(R)-199. The southern half of the six-mile-wide invasion beach was assigned to Task Force 55, commanded by Rear Admiral John Leslie Hall Jr. The assault troops were under Major General John R. Hodge. The southern support craft included LSM(R)-189, LSM(R)-190, LSM(R)-191, LSM(R)-192, and LSM(R)-193.

On 3 May 1945, the Japanese launched their fifth kikusui attack. Picket station 10 was the hardest hit. Shortly before dusk, the destroyer Aaron Ward was hit by a series of six kamikazes, suffering 45 killed or missing and 49 wounded. The ship survived, but was later decommissioned because it was not considered worth repairing. At about the same time, approximately 20 planes attacked the destroyer Little. She was crashed by four of them and sank within 12 minutes of the first hit. The result was 30 dead or missing and 79 wounded. LSM(R)-195 was also on Picket Station 10 and while rushing to the aid of the Aaron Ward and the Little was likewise crashed by a kamikaze. The crash started her rockets exploding and knocked out the fire main and auxiliary pumps. LSM-195 had to be abandoned and, after being ripped by heavy explosions, sank. On 4 May LSM(R)-190 was patrolling at Picket Station 12. Not long after sunrise the anticipated kamikazes arrived and were met by American combat air patrol. Several of the Japanese planes managed to get through and attack the ships on this station. Three kamikazes crashed LSM(R)-190. The ship that had seen so much previous action and had been credited with rescuing 180 survivors of other stricken ships was herself sunk. In the same attack, the destroyer Luce was sunk, carrying 126 of her 312 officers and men with her. At the same time as LSM(R)-190 was fighting her final battle, LSM(R)-194 was facing the same fate at Picket Station 1. This was the most critical station on the picket line. The capture of the Kerama Islands did not come without a price. On the night of 28 March, Japanese planes from Okinawa airfields made a special attack on the small patrol craft assembled between the islands and Okinawa. About a dozen were shot down, but one crashed into LSM(R)-188. There were 15 men killed and another 32 wounded. The badly damaged ship survived, but she was sent back to Pearl Harbor and saw no further combat.

== The Okinawa Radar Picket Line ( C.T.G. 52.21) ==
The American plan for defense against the kamikazes was to have fighters intercept the Japanese as early as possible. Sixteen radar picket stations were established around the island, in some cases almost 100 miles out, to give early warning of the Japanese planes, which might be coming from any direction. A handful of ships ranging from destroyers - manned around the clock - to minesweepers. Their job was to sound the alarm and vector fighters to intercept before the Japanese could attack the fleet anchored off Okinawa and the Allied forces and supply dump ashore. Unfortunately, some of the eager-to-die Japanese wanted to attack the first American ships they saw: the pickets. Dennis L. Francis LSM Commander, Flotilla Nine for the period 2–20 April, Action Report indicated that "[…] these ships are not particularly suited for picket duty. Since their primary function is to deliver rockets during invasion operations, it seems feasible that subjecting them to continual enemy air attacks will allow this secondary duty to seriously affect their ability to perform their primary function due to damage. They have no great value in combating enemy aircraft due to the absence of air search radar, adequate director control for the 5"/38 main battery, and director control for the 40mm single guns. The fact that they carry a considerable quantity of explosive rockets in their magazines presents another hazard. In general, it is believed that assigning them to picket duty should be avoided since it means risking the operation of a limited number of specialized ships which could be performed by any number of other landing craft whose primary function is more closely coincident with screening operations". Before these recommendations could be implemented, the LSM(R)-195 was sunk on 3 May 1945 with 9 killed and 16 wounded, the LSM(R)-190 was sunk on 4 May 1945 with 13 killed and 18 wounded, and the LSM(R)-194 was sunk on 4 May 1945 with 13 killed and 23 wounded.

The American victory at Okinawa cost the crew of LSM(R)-188 17 crew members killed.
