= USS LSM(R)-191 =

1944 LSM(R)-188-class Landing Ship Medium (Rocket)

History

United States
- Laid down: 27 August 1944
- Launched: 21 September 1944
- Commissioned: 21 November 1944
- Decommissioned: 12 February 1946
- Fate: Sold 20 January 1948, to R.J. MacCallum, Compton, CA. and converted to a barge, fate unknown

General characteristics
- Class & type: LSM(R)-188-class Landing Ship Medium (Rocket)
- Length: 203 ft 6 in (62.03 m)
- Beam: 34 ft (10 m)
- Draft: 5 ft 6 in (1.68 m) forward; 5 ft 9 in (1.75 m) aft
- Propulsion: GM Cleveland diesel engines, 2,800 shp (2,088 kW), direct drive, 2 screws
- Speed: 13.2 knots (24.4 km/h; 15.2 mph)
- Range: 5,000 nmi (9,300 km) at 7 kn (13 km/h; 8.1 mph)
- Complement: 5 officers, 76 enlisted
- Armament: 1 × 5-inch/38-caliber gun; 2 × 40 mm AA guns; 3 × 20 mm AA guns; 75 × 4-rail Mark 36 rocket launchers; 30 × 6-rail Mark 30 Rocket Launchers (removed early April 1955)

LSM(R)-191 was a World War II LSM(R)-188-class Landing Ship Medium (Rocket) fitted for firing a rocket barrage.

It was laid down at Charleston Navy Yard, Charleston, South Carolina. The ship was commissioned on 21 November 1944.

LSM(R)-191 took part in the assault and occupation of Okinawa on 26 March-3 June 1945.

== Service history ==
During World War II the ship was assigned to the Asiatic Pacific theater. At that time the fleet was under the command of Admiral Spruance and named the Fifth fleet. Vice Admiral Richmond Kelly Turner was Commander of Amphibious Forces Pacific and was to be in charge of operations until the beachhead was established. The Kerama Retto islands were a small chain of islands 15 miles west of the southwest tip of Okinawa. The invasion of the Kerma Retto was an opportunity to break in all twelve of the 188-class LSM(R)s. One of the reasons that Admiral Turner wanted to capture Kerama Retto was his knowledge that the Japanese Sea Raiding Units had suicide boats hidden there. On the morning of 29 March three of these boats attacked the USS LSM(R)-189 but were promptly destroyed. On 1 April 1945 the southern half of the six-mile-wide Okinawa invasion beach was assigned to Task Force 55, commanded by Rear Admiral John Leslie Hall Jr. with the assault troops under Major General John R. Hodge. The southern support craft included LSM(R)s 189, USS LSM(R)-190, USS LSM(R)-191, USS LSM(R)-192, and USS LSM(R)-193. The northern half of the six-mile-wide invasion beach was assigned to Task Force 53, under the command of Rear Admiral Lawrence F. Reifsnider. The LSMR's involved in the invasion as part of the Northern Tractor Flotilla included USS LSM(R)-194, USS LSM(R)-195, USS LSM(R)-196, USS LSM(R)-197, USS LSM(R)-198, and USS LSM(R)-199.

The American defense plan against kamikaze attack was for fighters to intercept the Japanese as early as possible. Sixteen radar picket stations were established around the island, in some cases almost 100 miles out, to give early warning in all directions. Each station was manned around the clock by a handful of ships ranging from destroyers down to minesweepers. Their job was to sound the alarm and vector fighters to intercept before the Japanese could attack the fleet off Okinawa or the Allied forces and supply dumps ashore. However some aircraft chose to attack the picket vessels. Dennis L. Francis who was LSM Commander, Flotilla Nine for the period 2 – 20 April, in his Action Report said of the LSMs "these ships are not particularly suited for picket duty...They have no great value in combating enemy air craft due to the absence of air search radar, adequate director control for the 5"/38 main battery, and director control for the 40mm single guns" He added that since their magazines held explosive rockets added to the hazard. He advised against putting them on the picket line when other vessels were available since there was a risk of losing these specialist vessels.

Before these recommendations were implemented LSM(R)-195 was sunk on 3 May 1945 with 9 killed and 16 wounded, LSM(R)-190 was sunk on 4 May 1945 with 13 killed and 18 wounded, and LSM(R)-194 was sunk on 4 May 1945 with 13 killed and 23 wounded.
