= USS LSM(R)-192 =

1944 LSM(R)-188-class Landing Ship Medium

History

United States
- Laid down: 7 September 1944
- Launched: 4 October 1944
- Commissioned: 21 November 1944
- Decommissioned: 26 February 1946
- Honours and awards: One Battle Star
- Fate: Sold for commercial service, 10 March 1948; Scrapped in 1963

General characteristics
- Class & type: LSM(R)-188 class Landing Ship Medium (Rocket)
- Length: 203 ft 6 in (62.03 m)
- Beam: 34 ft (10 m)
- Draft: 5 ft 6 in (1.68 m) forward; 5 ft 9 in (1.75 m) aft
- Propulsion: GM Cleveland diesel engines, 2,800 shp (2,088 kW), direct drive, 2 screws
- Speed: 13.2 knots (24.4 km/h; 15.2 mph)
- Range: 5,000 nmi (9,300 km) at 7 kn (13 km/h; 8.1 mph)
- Complement: 5 officers, 76 enlisted
- Armament: 1 × 5-inch/38-caliber gun; 2 × 40 mm AA guns; 3 × 20 mm AA guns; 75 × 4-rail Mk. 36 rocket launchers; 30 × 6-rail Mk. 30 rocket launchers; Removed early March 1945

LSM(R)-192 was a LSM(R)-188 class Landing Ship Medium (Rocket) of the US Navy during World War II. Laid down at Charleston Navy Yard, Charleston, South Carolina, the ship was commissioned on 21 November 1944.

== Service history (Turner) ==
During World War II, the ship was assigned to the Asiatic-Pacific theater. At that time, the fleet was under the command of Admiral Raymond A. Spruance and named the Fifth Fleet. Vice Admiral Richmond K. Turner was Commander of Amphibious Forces Pacific and was to be in charge of operations until the beachhead was established. The Kerama Retto islands were a small chain of islands 15 miles west of the southwest tip of Okinawa. The invasion of the Kerma Retto was an opportunity to break in all twelve of the 188-class LSM(R)s. One of the reasons that Admiral Turner wanted to capture Kerama Retto was his knowledge that the Japanese Sea Raiding Units had suicide boats hidden there. On the morning of 29 March three of these boats attacked the USS LSM(R)-189 but were promptly destroyed. The southern half of the six-mile-wide invasion beach was assigned to Task Force 55, commanded by Rear Admiral John Leslie Hall Jr. The assault troops were under Major General John R. Hodge. The southern support craft included USS LSM(R)-189, USS LSM(R)-190, USS LSM(R)-191, LSM(R)-192, and USS LSM(R)-193. On 3 May 1945 the 188-class LSM(R)'s were put to the test and were not found wanting. The action at the picket stations proved that the courage and punishment endured by US Navy personnel was unrelated to the size of the ship. The Japanese launched their fifth kikusui attack on 3 May. Picket station 10 was the hardest hit. Shortly before dusk, the destroyer USS Aaron Ward (DM-34) was hit by a series of six kamikazes, suffering 45 killed or missing and 49 wounded. The ship survived, but was later decommissioned because it wasn't worth repairing. About the same time, approximately 20 planes attacked destroyer USS Little (DD-803). She was crashed by four of them and sank within 12 minutes of the first hit. She lost 30 dead or missing and 79 wounded.USS LSM(R)-195 was also on Picket Station 10 and while rushing to the aid of the Aaron Ward and the Little was likewise crashed by a kamikaze. The crash started her rockets exploding and knocked out the fire main and auxiliary pumps. LSM(R) 195 had to be abandoned and, after being ripped by heavy explosions, sank. The following day the ordeal for the LSM(R)'s reached its tragic climax. The day dawned bright and ominous. LSM(R) 190 was patrolling at Picket Station 12. Not long after sunrise the anticipated kamikazes arrived and were met by American combat air patrol. Several of the Japanese planes managed to get through and attack the ships on this station. Three kamikazes crashed LSM(R) 190. The ship that had seen so much previous action and had been credited with rescuing 180 survivors of other stricken ships was herself sunk. In the same attack the destroyer USS Luce was sunk, carrying 126 of her 312 officers and men with her. At the same time as LSM(R) 190 was fighting her final battle, USS LSM(R)-194 was facing the same fate at Picket Station 1. This was the most critical station on the picket line. The capture of the Kerama Islands did not come without a price. On the night of 28 March, Japanese planes from Okinawa airfields made a special attack on the small patrol craft assembled between the islands and Okinawa. About a dozen were shot down, but one crashed into USS LSM(R)-188. There were 15 men killed and another 32 wounded. The badly damaged ship survived, but she was sent back to Pearl Harbor and saw no further combat. No one realized at the time that this was a preview of what this class of ship would suffer six weeks later on the picket line. On 13 April 1945, LSM(R)'s 192, 193, 196, 197, 198, 199 and LC(FF) 535 were assigned to night harassment patrols and destructive bombardment of Ie Shima from period beginning 13 April through 16 April 1945. The LSM(R)'s utilized irregular rocket fire for destructive harassment, 5" star shell for illumination and harassment, and 40 mm to prevent any reinforcement of the beach defenses.

== A Small Boy with the Firepower of a Battleship (James M. Stewart) ==
The LSM(R) was heralded in the 16 April 1945 issue of Life Magazine with a centerfold picture. Each of these tiny ships had amazing firepower, greater at short range than the combined firepower of two mammoth Iowa class battleships, ran the caption. The interim group of 12 LSM(R)s transited the Panama Canal and via San Diego, Honolulu, and the Philippines, headed for battle against Japan in March 1945. Unaware of their destination, the crews were nonetheless well equipped and trained. In a preliminary assault on 26 March 1945, they laid down a rocket barrage at dawn on Kerama Retta, a small cluster of islands off the southwestern shore of Okinawa. Their objective: to allow the Marines to swiftly land and secure the islands and the harbor for protection of the hospital, supply and communication ships, and floating drydocks. The early dawn assault surprised the Japanese. The marines took control with a minimum of casualties and established this haven for damaged ships.
