= USS LSM(R)-193 =

1944 LSM(R)-188-class Landing Ship Medium

History

United States
- Laid down: 7 September 1944
- Launched: 4 October 1944
- Commissioned: 21 November 1944
- Decommissioned: 26 February 1946
- Honors and awards: One Battle Star; Presidential Unit Citation
- Fate: Sold, 20 January 1948

General characteristics
- Class & type: LSM(R)-188-class Landing Ship Medium (Rocket)
- Length: 203 ft 6 in (62.03 m)
- Beam: 34 ft (10 m)
- Draft: 5 ft 6 in (1.68 m) forward; 5 ft 9 in (1.75 m) aft
- Propulsion: GM Cleveland diesel engines, 2,800 shp (2,088 kW), direct drive, 2 screws
- Speed: 13.2 knots (24.4 km/h; 15.2 mph)
- Range: 5,000 nmi (9,300 km) at 7 kn (13 km/h; 8.1 mph)
- Complement: 5 officers, 76 enlisted
- Armament: 1 × 5-inch/38-caliber gun; 2 × 40 mm AA guns; 3 × 20 mm AA guns; 75 × 4-rail Mk. 36 rocket launchers; 30 × 6-rail Mk. 30 rocket launchers (Removed April 1945)

LSM(R)-193 was an American Landing Ship Medium (Rocket) built in 1944, which provided naval gunfire and rocket support for US and Allied amphibious landings in World War II. It was laid down at Charleston Navy Yard and commissioned on 21 November 1944. It participated in the Battle of Okinawa as well as the run-up to the battle

== Service history (Turner) ==
It was laid down at Charleston Navy Yard, Charleston, South Carolina, and was commissioned on 21 November 1944.

During World War II the ship was assigned to the Asiatic Pacific theater. At that time the fleet was under the command of Admiral Spruance and named the Fifth fleet. Vice Admiral Richmond Kelly Turner was Commander of Amphibious Forces Pacific and was to be in charge of operations until the beachhead was established. The Kerama Retto islands were a small chain of islands 15 miles west of the southwest tip of Okinawa. The invasion of the Kerma Retto was an opportunity to break in all twelve of the 188-class LSM(R)s. One of the reasons that Admiral Turner wanted to capture Kerama Retto was his knowledge that the Japanese Sea Raiding Units had suicide boats hidden there. On the morning of 29 March three of these boats attacked the USS LSM(R)-189 but were promptly destroyed. The southern half of the six-mile-wide invasion beach was assigned to Task Force 55, commanded by Rear Admiral John Leslie Hall, Jr. The assault troops were under Major General John R. Hodge. The southern support craft included LSM(R)-189, USS LSM(R)-190, USS LSM(R)-191, USS LSM(R)-192, and USS LSM(R)-193. On 3 May 1945 the 188-class LSM(R)s were put to the test and were not found wanting. The action at the picket stations proved that the courage and punishment endured by US Navy personnel was unrelated to the size of the ship. The Japanese launched their fifth kikusui attack on 3 May. Picket station 10 was the hardest hit. Shortly before dusk, the destroyer USS Aaron Ward was hit by a series of six kamikazes, suffering 45 killed or missing and 49 wounded. The ship survived, but was later decommissioned because it wasn't worth repairing. About the same time, approximately 20 planes attacked destroyer USS Little. She was crashed by four of them and sank within 12 minutes of the first hit. She lost 30 dead or missing and 79 wounded. USS LSM(R)-195 was also on Picket Station 10 and while rushing to the aid of the Aaron Ward and the Little was likewise crashed by a kamikaze. The crash started her rockets exploding and knocked out the fire main and auxiliary pumps. LSM(R)-195 had to be abandoned and, after being ripped by heavy explosions, sank. The following day the ordeal for the LSM(R)'s reached its tragic climax. The day dawned bright and ominous. LSM(R)-190 was patrolling at Picket Station 12. Not long after sunrise the anticipated kamikazes arrived and were met by American combat air patrol. Several of the Japanese planes managed to get through and attack the ships on this station. Three kamikazes crashed LSM(R) 190. The ship that had seen so much previous action and had been credited with rescuing 180 survivors of other stricken ships was herself sunk. In the same attack the destroyer USS Luce was sunk, carrying 126 of her 312 officers and men with her. At the same time as LSM(R)-190 was fighting her final battle, USS LSM(R)-194 was facing the same fate at Picket Station 1. This was the most critical station on the picket line. The capture of the Kerama Islands did not come without a price. On the night of 28 March, Japanese planes from Okinawa airfields made a special attack on the small patrol craft assembled between the islands and Okinawa. About a dozen were shot down, but one crashed into USS LSM(R)-188. There were 15 men killed and another 32 wounded. The badly damaged ship survived, but she was sent back to Pearl Harbor and saw no further combat. No one realized at the time that this was a preview of what this class of ship would suffer six weeks later on the picket line.

On 13 April 1945, LSM(R)'s 192, 193, 196, 197, 198, 199 and LC(FF)-535 were assigned to night harassment patrols and destructive bombardment of Ie Shima from period beginning 13 April through 16 April 1945. The LSM(R)s utilized irregular rocket fire for destructive harassment, 5" star shell for illumination and harassment, and 40 mm to prevent any reinforcement of the beach defenses. On 11 May 1945 LSM(R)-193 (Lt. Donald E. Boynton, USNR) responded to the Kamikaze attack on the USS Hugh W. Hadley (DD-774). CO USS Hugh V. Hadley comments: The LSM 193 and the LCS 83 were responsible for recovering all personnel in the water. These two ships did a remarkable job in caring for the wounded, expediting the fighting of the fire, and later towing. Lieutenant (later LCDR) Boynton was awarded the Silver Star. LSM(R) 193 was awarded the Presidential Unit Citation.

== Okinawa Radar Picket Line (C.T.G.52.21) ==
The American plan for defense against the kamikazes was to have fighters intercept the Japanese as early as possible. Sixteen radar picket stations were established around the island of Okinawa in preparation for the invasion of that island, in some cases almost 100 miles out, to give early warning of the Japanese planes which might be coming from any direction. Each station was manned around the clock by a handful of ships ranging from destroyers down to minesweepers. Their job was to sound the alarm and vector fighters to intercept before the Japanese could attack the fleet anchored off Okinawa and the Allied forces and supply dumps ashore. Unfortunately, some of the eager-to-die Japanese wanted to attack the first American ships they saw: the pickets. Dennis L. Francis LSM Commander, Flotilla Nine for the period 2 – 20 April, Action Report indicated that . . ."these ships are not particularly suited for picket duty. Since their primary function is to deliver rockets during invasion operations, it seems feasible that subjecting them to continual enemy air attack will allow this secondary duty to seriously affect their ability to perform their primary function due to damage. They have no great value in combating enemy air craft due to the absence of air search radar, adequate director control for the 5"/38 main battery, and director control for the 40mm single guns. The fact that they carry a considerable quantity of explosive rockets in their magazines presents another hazard. In general, it is believed that assigning them to picket duty should be avoided since it means risking the operation of a limited number of specialized ships which could be performed by any number of other landing craft whose primary function is more closely coincident with screening operations." Before these recommendations were implemented the USS LSMR-195 was sunk on 3 May 1945 with 9 killed and 16 wounded, the USS LSMR-190 was sunk on 4 May 1945 with 13 killed and 18 wounded, the USS LSMR-194 was sunk on 4 May 1945 with 13 killed and 23 wounded.
