= USS Mannert L. Abele =

Allen M. Sumner-class destroyer

Coordinates: 27°15′0″N 126°30′0″E

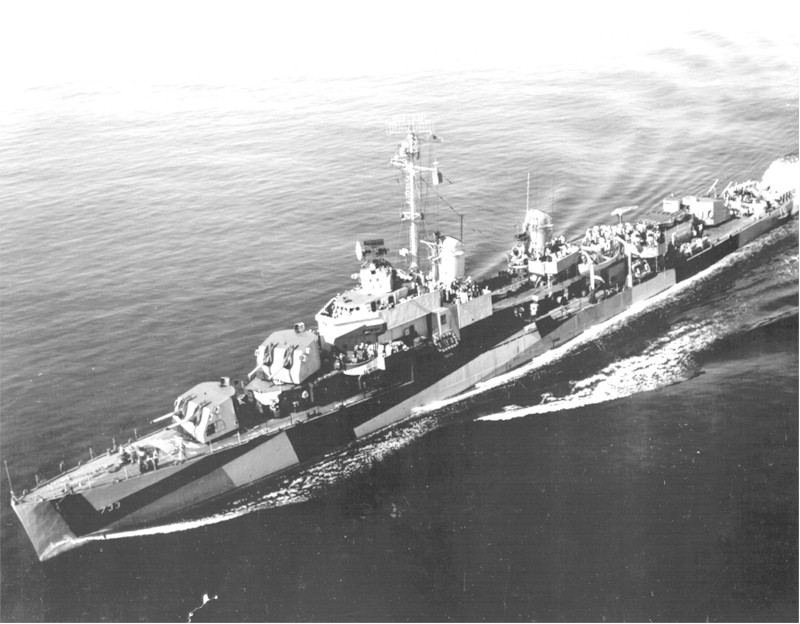

History

United States
- Name: Mannert L. Abele
- Namesake: Mannert Lincoln Abele
- Builder: Bath Iron Works
- Laid down: 9 December 1943
- Launched: 23 April 1944
- Commissioned: 4 July 1944
- Fate: Sunk by Ohka suicide flying bomb during the battle for Okinawa 12 April 1945

General characteristics
- Class & type: Allen M. Sumner-class destroyer
- Displacement: 2,200 tons
- Length: 376 ft 6 in (114.76 m)
- Beam: 40 ft (12 m)
- Draft: 15 ft 8 in (4.78 m)
- Installed power: 60,000 shp (45,000 kW);
- Propulsion: 2 propellers
- Speed: 34 knots (63 km/h; 39 mph)
- Range: 6,500 nmi (12,000 km; 7,500 mi) at 15 kn (28 km/h; 17 mph)
- Complement: 336
- Armament: 6 × 5 in (130 mm)/38 caliber guns (3x2), 12 × 40 mm AA guns, 11 × 20 mm AA guns, 10 × 21 inch (533 mm) torpedo tubes (10 torpedoes), 6 × depth charge projectors, 2 × depth charge tracks

USS Mannert L. Abele (DD-733), was an Allen M. Sumner-class destroyer of the United States Navy. The destroyer was sunk on 12 April 1945, near Okinawa with 84 casualties. She was the first US warship to be damaged or sunk by the rocket powered Yokosuka MXY7 Ohka suicide flying bomb.

== Namesake ==
Mannert Lincoln Abele was born on 11 July 1903 in Quincy, Massachusetts. He attended Cranch Grammar School and three years at Quincy High School before enlisting in the Navy at the age of seventeen on 12 August 1920. Assigned to battleship USS Utah just before she departed for European duty, Abele attained the rank of apprentice seaman while training at Newport, Rhode Island. Detached from Utah in December 1921, Abele received orders to take entrance examinations to the United States Naval Academy. Upon his appointment-at-large, he became a midshipman in June 1922. He was commissioned ensign on 3 June 1926. Upon graduation he served on board the battleship USS Colorado, serving until 7 January 1929. Applying for submarine school, he was accepted and reported to the Submarine Base New London, Connecticut, for instruction. Completing the course several months later, he received assignment to USS S-23, a unit of Submarine Division 4, serving on board as engineering officer until April 1933. Receiving orders for shore duty to the Bureau of Navigation, Navy Department, until 30 May 1936, he was promoted to lieutenant on 30 June 1936. He served first on board USS R-11 before accepting command of USS R-13. While commanding R-13, his commanding officer described him as "the ablest commanding officer in the division," leading R-13 to receive the "E" for excellence award. From June 1939 – August 1940, he served as assistant professor of naval science, in connection with the Naval Reserve Officers Training Corps (NROTC) unit at Harvard University. He was promoted to lieutenant commander on 1 December 1940.

Receiving orders to USS S-31, Abele commanded that boat from August 1940 to November 1941, before fitting out USS Grunion, built at the Electric Boat Company, Groton, Connecticut, and assuming command upon its commissioning on 11 April 1942. Receiving orders on 19 July 1942 to proceed with USS S-32, USS Triton and USS Tuna, to patrol an area approaching Kiska harbor, Grunion and the three boats were to make way to Kiska by 22 July. Grunion reported an attack on unidentified enemy ships 6 miles (9.7 km) south off Sirius Point, Kiska, on 28 July. Firing two torpedoes, Abele observed no explosions. Resuming duties in its patrol area, the official Navy account states an intensive increase in Imperial Japanese Navy anti-submarine activity off Kiska caused Grunion’s recall to Dutch Harbor, Alaska, on 30 July 1942. Grunion never arrived at Dutch Harbor and all communications went unanswered. Reported missing on 16 August 1942, the U.S. Navy presumed it lost on 5 October. Stricken from the Navy Register on 2 November, Grunion would remain missing for the next 65 years. In October 2008, the U.S. Navy confirmed that the wreck of Grunion was found.

== History ==
Mannert L. Abele was laid down by Bath Iron Works, Bath, Maine, on 9 December 1943; launched on 23 April 1944; sponsored by Mrs. Mannert L. Abele; and commissioned at Boston, Massachusetts, on 4 July 1944.

After shakedown off Bermuda, Mannert L. Abele served as a training ship for destroyer crews in Chesapeake Bay before departing Norfolk, Virginia, on 16 October for duty in the Pacific. Steaming via San Diego, she reached Pearl Harbor on 17 November for two weeks of intensive training. She sailed in convoy for the western Pacific on 3 December, but returned two weeks later for conversion to a fighter director ship. She received special radio and radar equipment and completed radar picket training before departing on 27 January 1945 for the invasion of Iwo Jima.

Assigned to the transport screen of Vice Admiral Richmond K. Turner's Task Force 51 (TF 51), she steamed via Eniwetok and Saipan and screened ships of the assault force during amphibious landings on 19 February. The next day, she joined the fire support group for shore bombardment and close support gunfire operations. During the next 28 hours, she blasted numerous enemy gun emplacements, blockhouses, and caves. In addition, she provided night illumination and harassing fire in support of ground operations by the 5th Marine Division. She resumed screening and radar picket duty at dusk 21 February.

On 3–4 March and again from 8–10 March, Mannert L. Abele served on the bombardment line as effective naval firepower provided valuable support for the Marines' ground campaign. On 10 March, she steamed to Ulithi, arriving on 12 March.

Mannert L. Abele departed on 20 March for radar picket duty off Ulithi and the next day she joined Task Force 54 (TF 54), Rear Admiral Morton Deyo’s Gunfire and Covering Force, for the invasion of Okinawa. She reached the Ryukyus on 24 March, and during the next week she screened heavy shore bombardment ships during preinvasion operations from Kerama Retto to Ie Shima. In addition, she pounded enemy positions and supported UDT operations at proposed assault beaches on Okinawa.

As American troops stormed the beaches on 1 April, Mannert L. Abele provided close fire support before beginning radar picket patrols northeast of Okinawa later that day. On 3 April, three Japanese planes attacked her, but the destroyer shot down two of the raiders. Released from picket duty on 5 April, she resumed screen patrols off the beaches. On 6 April, she helped shoot down an attacking twin‑engined bomber.

The next day, Mannert L. Abele regrouped with TF 54 to protect the transports off Okinawa from ships of the Surface Special Attack Force, including the Japanese battleship Yamato, steaming south from Japan in a final effort to destroy American seapower. However, planes of the Fast Carrier Task Force wiped out the enemy’s thrust with bomb and torpedo strikes, sinking six Japanese ships and damaging the four surviving destroyers.

Mannert L. Abele resumed radar picket duty on 8 April, patrolling station No. 14 about 70 nmi (81 mi; 130 km) northwest of Okinawa, accompanied by LSM(R)-189 and LSM(R)-190. Midway through the afternoon watch on 12 April, Mannert L. Abele caught the full fury of the kamikaze. Three Aichi D3A "Vals" attacked at 13:45, but gunfire drove off two and set fire to the third which failed in an attempt to crash into LSM(R)-189. By 14:00, between 15 and 25 additional planes "had come down from the North and the ship was completely surrounded." Except for one light bomber which challenged and was damaged by the destroyer's fire, the enemy kept outside her gun range for more than half an hour.

At about 14:40, three Mitsubishi A6M Zeroes broke orbit and closed to attack. Mannert L. Abele drove off one and shot down another about 4,000 yd (3,700 m) out. Despite numerous hits from 5‑inch and light anti-aircraft fire, and spewing smoke and flame, the third kamikaze crashed into the starboard side and penetrated the aft engine room where it exploded. LSM(R)-189's captain, James M. Stewart, reported, "It is difficult to say what it was that hit the DD 733. This officer personally saw what appeared to be two (2) planes orbiting in a northerly direction from the DD 733, and then suddenly, what appeared to be, one plane, accelerated at a terrific rate, too fast for us to fire at. This plane dove at an angle of approximately 30 degrees, starting at about four miles [7.5 km] away. Since we had no air search radar, the above statements are merely my own conclusions." (This may have been one of the earliest intelligence reports of the Ohka kamikaze aircraft.)

Immediately, Mannert L. Abele began to lose headway. The downward force of the blast, which had wiped out the after engineering spaces, broke the destroyer's keel midships, abaft No. 2 stack. The bridge lost control and all guns and directors lost power.

A minute later, at about 14:46, Mannert L. Abele took a second and fatal hit from a Yokosuka MXY-7 Ohka kamikaze rocket powered flying bomb that struck the starboard waterline abreast the forward fireroom. Its 2,600 lb (1,200 kg) warhead exploded, buckling the ship, and "cutting out all power, lights, and communications."

Almost immediately, the destroyer broke in two, her midship section obliterated. Her bow and stern sections sank rapidly. As survivors clustered in the churning waters enemy planes bombed and strafed them. However, LSM(R)-189 and LSM(R)-190 shot down two of the remaining attackers, repelled further attacks and rescued the survivors. The number of casualties of her sinking was 84 killed according to a book by Roy S. Andersen who was among the survivors.

Mannert L. Abele was the first of three radar pickets hit by an Ohka, but the only ship sunk by one during the Okinawa campaign. Despite the Japanese efforts, the radar pickets successfully completed their mission, thus ensuring the success of the campaign for the Americans.

Roy S. Andersen, a survivor of the Mannert L. Abele sinking, wrote a detailed history in a book published in 2007 by Jana Press entitled, Three Minutes off Okinawa: The Sinking of the Radar Picket Destroyer the U. S. S. Mannert L. Abele by Japanese Kamikaze Aircraft .

The wreck of the Mannert L. Abele was located about 75 miles (121 km) off the northern coast of Okinawa in December 2022 by the Lost 52 Project.

== Awards ==
USS Mannert L. Abele received two battle stars for World War II service.
