= USS LSM(R)-196 =

1944 LSM(R)-188-class Landing Ship Medium

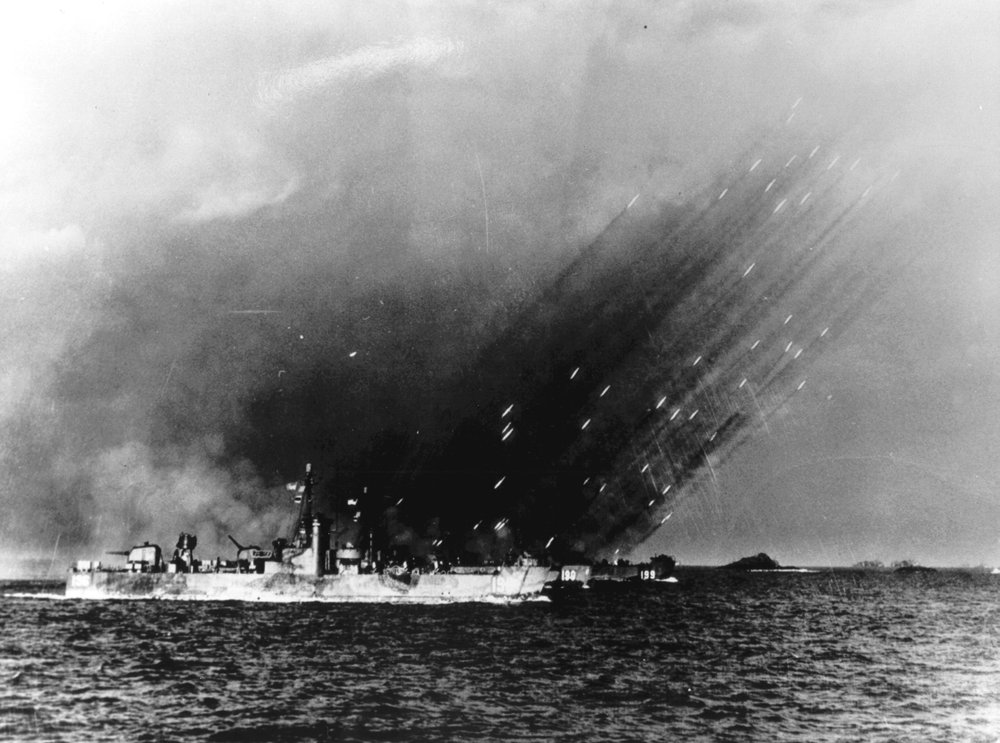
- LSM(R)-196 (foreground), LSM(R)-190 (middle) and LSM(R)-199 (background) firing rockets off Tokishi Shima, March 1945

History

United States
- Name: USS LSM(R)-190
- Laid down: 13 September 1944
- Launched: 12 October 1944
- Commissioned: 8 December 1944
- Decommissioned: 26 March 1946
- Honors and awards: One Battle Star
- Fate: Sold, 11 September 1947

General characteristics
- Class & type: LSM(R)-188-class Landing Ship Medium (Rocket)
- Length: 203 ft 6 in (62.03 m)
- Beam: 34 ft (10 m)
- Draft: 5 ft 6 in (1.68 m) forward; 5 ft 9 in (1.75 m) aft
- Propulsion: GM Cleveland diesel engines, 2,800 shp (2,088 kW), direct drive, 2 screws
- Speed: 13.2 knots (24.4 km/h; 15.2 mph)
- Range: 5,000 nmi (9,300 km) at 7 kn (13 km/h; 8.1 mph)
- Complement: 5 officers, 76 enlisted
- Armament: 1 × 5-inch/38-caliber gun; 2 × 40 mm AA guns; 3 × 20 mm AA guns; 85 × Mk. 51 automatic rocket launchers

LSM(R)-196 was a US amphibious assault ship, laid down at Charleston Navy Yard. It was commissioned on 12 December 1944.

== Service history (Turner) ==
During World War II the ship was assigned to the Asia-Pacific theater. At that time the fleet was under the command of Admiral Spruance and named the Fifth fleet. Vice Admiral Richmond Kelly Turner was Commander of Amphibious Forces Pacific and was to be in charge of operations until the beachhead was established. The Kerama Retto islands were a small chain of islands 15 miles west of the southwest tip of Okinawa. The invasion of the Kerma Retto was an opportunity to break in all twelve of the 188-class LSM(R)s. One of the reasons that Admiral Turner wanted to capture Kerama Retto was his knowledge that the Japanese Sea Raiding Units had suicide boats hidden there. On the morning of 29 March three of these boats attacked the USS LSM(R)-189 but were promptly destroyed. The northern half of the six-mile-wide invasion beach was assigned to Task Force 53, under the command of Rear Admiral Lawrence F. Reifsnider. Embarked were the 1st and 6th Marine Divisions under Major General Roy S. Geiger. The northern support craft included USS LSM(R)-194, USS LSM(R)-195, USS LSM(R)-196, USS LSM(R)-197, USS LSM(R)-198, and USS LSM(R)-199.

On 3 May 1945 the 188-class LSM(R)s were put to the test and were not found wanting. The action at the picket stations proved that the courage and punishment endured by US Navy personnel was unrelated to the size of the ship. The Japanese launched their fifth kikusui attack on 3 May. Picket station 10 was the hardest hit. Shortly before dusk, the destroyer USS Aaron Ward (DM-34) was hit by a series of six kamikazes, suffering 45 killed or missing and 49 wounded. The ship survived, but was later decommissioned because it wasn't worth repairing. About the same time, approximately 20 planes attacked destroyer USS Little (DD-803).

She was crashed by four of them and sank within 12 minutes of the first hit. She lost 30 dead or missing and 79 wounded. LSM(R)-195 was also on Picket Station 10 and while rushing to the aid of Aaron Ward and the Little was likewise crashed by a kamikaze. The crash started her rockets exploding and knocked out the fire main and auxiliary pumps. LSM(R)-195 had to be abandoned and, after being ripped by heavy explosions, sank. The following day the ordeal for the LSM(R)s reached its tragic climax. The day dawned bright and ominous. USS LSM(R)-190 was patrolling at Picket Station 12. Not long after sunrise the anticipated kamikazes arrived and were met by American combat air patrol. Several of the Japanese planes managed to get through and attack the ships on this station. Three kamikazes crashed LSM(R)-190. The ship that had seen so much previous action and had been credited with rescuing 180 survivors of other stricken ships was herself sunk. In the same attack the destroyer USS Luce was sunk, carrying 126 of her 312 officers and men with her. At the same time as LSM(R)-190 was fighting her final battle, LSM(R)-194 was facing the same fate at Picket Station 1. GM1c Joseph A. Staum crewman of the LSM(R)-196 was killed off Okinawa on 1 April 1945.

== Okinawa Radar Picket Line(C.T.G. 52.21) ==
The American plan for defense against the kamikazes was to have fighters intercept the Japanese as early as possible. Sixteen radar picket stations were established around the island, in some cases almost 100 miles out, to give early warning of the Japanese planes which might be coming from any direction. Each station was manned around the clock by a handful of ships ranging from destroyers down to minesweepers. Their job was to sound the alarm and vector fighters to intercept before the Japanese could attack the fleet anchored off Okinawa and the Allied forces and supply dumps ashore. Unfortunately, some of the eager-to-die Japanese wanted to attack the first American ships they saw: the pickets. Dennis L. Francis LSM Commander, Flotilla Nine for the period 2 – 20 April, Action Report indicated that these ships are not particularly suited for picket duty. Since their primary function is to deliver rockets during invasion operations, it seems feasible that subjecting them to continual enemy air attack will allow this secondary duty to seriously affect their ability to perform their primary function due to damage. They have no great value in combating enemy air craft due to the absence of air search radar, adequate director control for the 5"/38 main battery, and director control for the 40mm single guns. The fact that they carry a considerable quantity of explosive rockets in their magazines presents another hazard. In general, it is believed that assigning them to picket duty should be avoided since it means risking the operation of a limited number of specialized ships which could be performed by any number of other landing craft whose primary function is more closely coincident with screening operations. Before these recommendations were implemented LSMR-195 was sunk on 3 May 1945 with 9 killed and 16 wounded, LSMR-190 was sunk on 4 May 1945 with 13 killed and 18 wounded, LSMR-194 was sunk on 4 May 1945 with 13 killed and 23 wounded.
