= USS LSM(R)-190 =

1944 LSM(R)-188-class Landing Ship Medium (Rocket)

LSM(R)-190
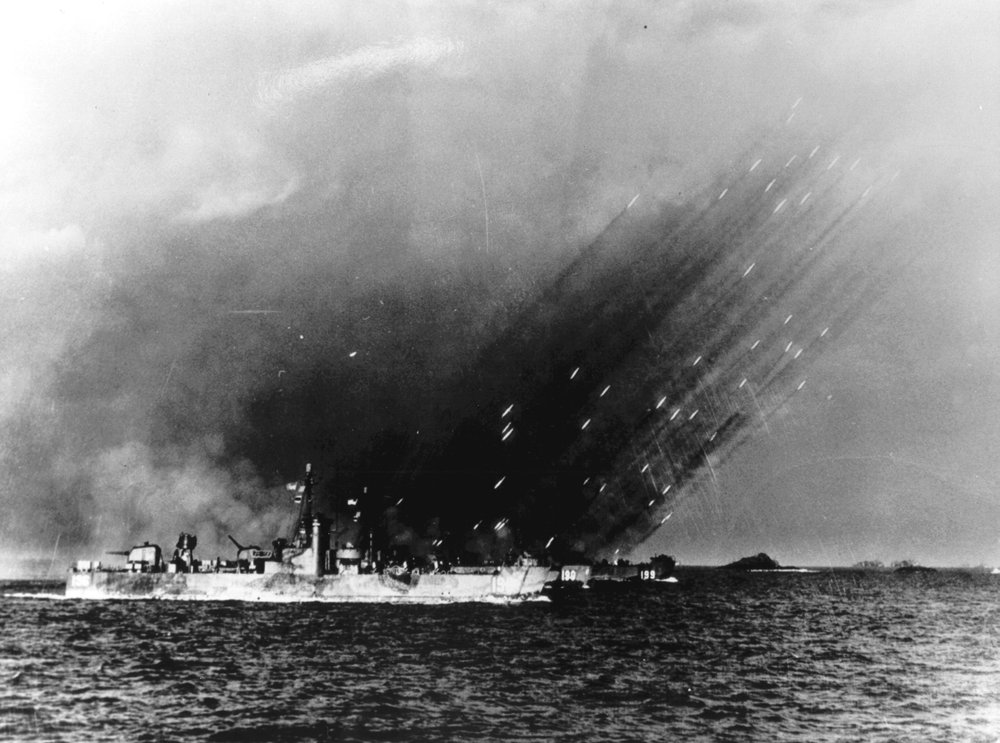
- LSM(R)-196 (foreground), LSM(R)-190 (middle) and LSM(R)-199 (background) firing rockets off Tokishi Shima, March 1945

History

United States
- Laid down: 27 August 1944
- Launched: 21 September 1944
- Commissioned: 23 November 1944
- Honours and awards: One Battle Star, Navy Unit Commendation
- Fate: Sunk by Japanese Kamikaze plane off Okinawa, 4 May 1945

General characteristics
- Class & type: LSM(R)-188-class Landing Ship Medium (Rocket)
- Length: 203 ft 6 in (62.03 m)
- Beam: 34 ft (10 m)
- Draft: 5 ft 6 in (1.68 m) forward; 5 ft 9 in (1.75 m) aft
- Propulsion: GM Cleveland diesel engines, 2,800 shp (2,088 kW), direct drive, 2 screws
- Speed: 13.2 knots (24.4 km/h; 15.2 mph)
- Range: 5,000 nmi (9,300 km) at 7 kn (13 km/h; 8.1 mph)
- Complement: 5 officers, 76 enlisted
- Armament: 1 × 5-inch/38-caliber gun; 2 × 40 mm AA guns; 3 × 20 mm AA guns; 75 × 4-rail Mk. 36 rocket launchers; 30 × 6-rail Mk. 30 rocket launchers; Removed early 1945

USS LSM(R)-190 was a United States Navy LSM(R)-188-class Landing Ship Medium (Rocket). She was built at Charleston Navy Yard, Charleston, South Carolina and was commissioned on 21 November 1944. LSM(R)-190 took part in the Battle of Okinawa from 7 April–4 May 1945. She was hit and sunk by a Japanese suicide plane on 4 May 1945 while on the radar picket line. She later received a Navy Unit Commendation for her service off Okinawa.

== Design History (Friedman) ==
The LSM(R)-190 was one of twelve amphibious ships that evolved during World War II as battle experience identified new weapon requirements for the invasion of the Japanese home islands. The origins of the LSM(R) can be traced to a British Admiralty lend lease request for special amphibious transports to land tanks for the invasion of France.

This presented two design problems. It required the design of oceangoing ships that could safely and efficiently travel from the US to England and second; include shallow drafts for beach landings.

During October 1941 Major R. E. Holloway, Royal Engineers, brought to the attention of the US Navy an idea patented by Otto Popper of Bratislava, Czechoslovakia in 1924 of a barge transporter for use on the Danube River that flooded down to allow barges aboard, then pumped out it tanks to lift them out of the water. Norman Freidman reports that on 4 November 1941 this concept led to the breakthrough design by John C. Niedermair, civilian technical director, BuShips preliminary design section, based on ballasting techniques used on submarines that solved both design problems. This led to the construction of thousands of US Navy amphibious ships including the original LST's and with hundreds of incremental improvements modifications and conversions of LTC's, LCM's and LSM's.

British and US visionaries instrumental in supporting the concept include Captain Thomas A Hussey, COHO, and Sir Henry C. B. Weymss of the British mission to the US, Captain Edward Cochrane BuShips, the Army's Chief of Staff General George C. Marshall and Winston Churchill when he personally pushed the project for special amphibious ships and won President Roosevelt's reluctant approval.

This decision proved providential a short time later with the Japanese attack on Pearl Harbor. The design criteria for the US Navy amphibious forces for the invasion of Japan was already underway.

In 1944 with the US Navy BuOrd's mounting of a 5-inch/38 gun and state of the art rocket launchers on the LSM its mission changed and the LSM(R) became the "ultimate" landing troop fire support out to 4,000 yards beyond the beach, designed for interdiction, harassment, destruction, illumination and high trajectory fire to destroy reverse slope targets for the invasion of Japan.

== Service history (Turner) ==
During World War II the ship was assigned to the Asiatic Pacific theater. At that time the fleet was under the command of Admiral Spruance and named the Fifth fleet. Vice Admiral Richmond Kelly Turner was Commander of Amphibious Forces Pacific and was to be in charge of operations until the beachhead was established. The Kerama Retto islands were a small chain of islands 15 miles west of the southwest tip of Okinawa. The invasion of the Kerma Retto was an opportunity to break in all twelve of the 188-class LSM(R)s. One of the reasons that Admiral Turner wanted to capture Kerama Retto was his knowledge that the Japanese Sea Raiding Units had suicide boats hidden there. On the morning of 29 March three of these boats attacked the USS LSM(R)-189 but were promptly destroyed. On 1 April 1945 the southern half of the six-mile-wide Okinawa invasion beach was assigned to Task Force 55, commanded by Rear Admiral John Leslie Hall Jr. The assault troops were under Major General John R. Hodge. The southern support craft included LSM(R)s 189, USS LSM(R)-190, USS LSM(R)-191, USS LSM(R)-192, and USS LSM(R)-193. The northern half of the six-mile-wide invasion beach was assigned to Task Force 53, under the command of Rear Admiral Lawrence F. Reifsnider. The LSMR's involved in the invasion as part of the Northern Tractor Flotilla included USS LSM(R)-194, USS LSM(R)-195, USS LSM(R)-196, USS LSM(R)-197, USS LSM(R)-198, and USS LSM(R)-199.

On 4 May 1945 LSM(R) 190 was patrolling at Picket Station 12. Not long after sunrise the anticipated kamikazes arrived and were met by American combat air patrol. Several of the Japanese planes managed to get through and attack the ships on this station. Three kamikazes crashed into LSM(R) 190.

As the fires were now beyond control and ship had developed a decided port list, it was decided to abandon ship. Twenty minutes later, at approximately 0850, the ship went down. USS LSM(R) 190 lost 14 killed and 18 wounded and was awarded the Navy Unit Commendation, for meritorious service in action against enemy Japanese Kamikaze aircraft.
