= USS LSM-355 =

LSM-1-class landing ship medium

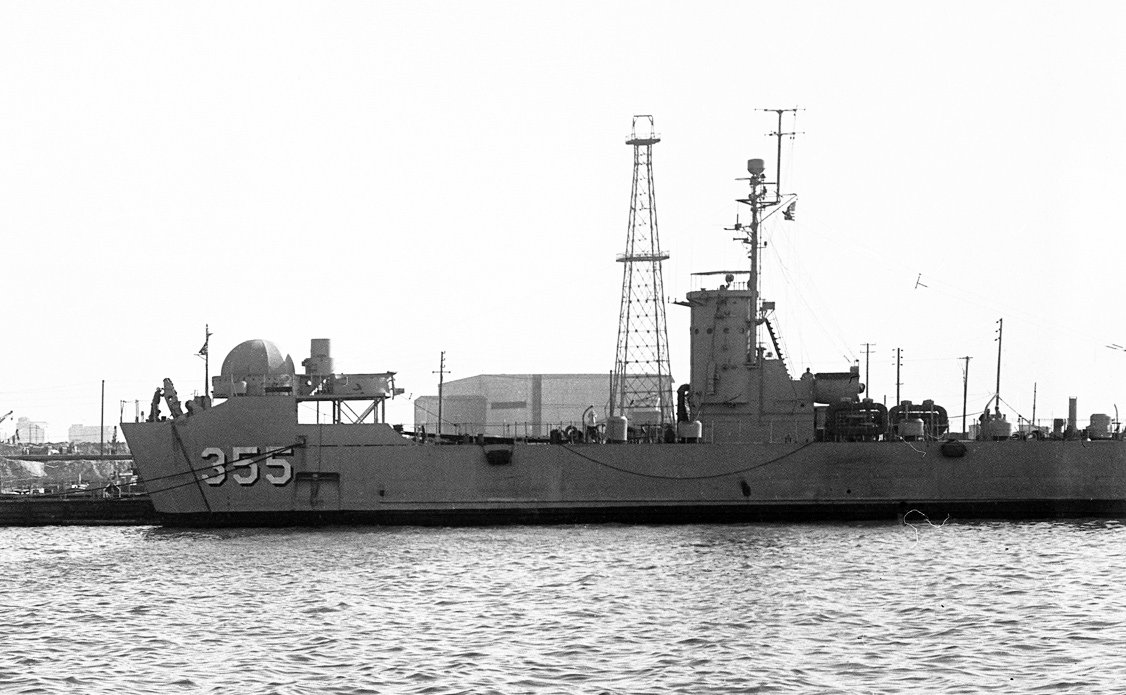
- USS LSM-355

History

United States
- Name: LSM-355
- Builder: Brown Shipbuilding Co., Houston
- Laid down: 11 November 1944
- Launched: 2 December 1944
- Commissioned: 24 December 1944
- Decommissioned: 23 October 1946
- Recommissioned: 18 September 1950
- Decommissioned: 11 January 1954
- Identification: Callsign: NVMS
- Honors and awards: See Awards
- Fate: Transferred to France, 22 January 1954

History

France
- Name: L9011
- Acquired: 22 January 1954
- Commissioned: 28 June 1954
- Decommissioned: October 1955
- Fate: Transferred to South Vietnam, October 1955

History

South Vietnam
- Name: Hát Giang
- Namesake: Hát Giang
- Acquired: October 1955
- Commissioned: December 1955
- Decommissioned: 30 April 1975
- Identification: Pennant number: HQ-400
- Fate: Transferred to Philippines, 30 April 1975

History

Philippines
- Name: Western Samar
- Namesake: Western Samar
- Acquired: 30 April 1975
- Commissioned: 17 November 1975
- Decommissioned: prior 1985
- Identification: Pennant number: LP-66
- Fate: Sold to merchant service, 4 October 1977

General characteristics
- Class & type: LSM-1-class landing ship medium
- Displacement: 520 long tons (528 t) light; 743 long tons (755 t) landing; 1,095 long tons (1,113 t) full load
- Length: 203 ft 6 in (62.03 m) o/a
- Beam: 34 ft 6 in (10.52 m)
- Draft: 3 ft 6 in (1.07 m) forward; 7 ft 8 in (2.34 m) aft; Fully loaded : 6 ft 4 in (1.93 m) forward; 8 ft 3 in (2.51 m) aft
- Propulsion: 2 × Fairbanks-Morse (model 38D81/8X10, reversible with hydraulic clutch) diesels. Direct drive with 1,440 bhp (1,074 kW) each @ 720 rpm, twin screws
- Speed: 13.2 knots (15.2 mph; 24.4 km/h)
- Range: 4,900 nmi (9,100 km) at 12 kn (22 km/h)
- Capacity: 5 medium or 3 heavy tanks, or 6 LVTs, or 9 DUKWs
- Troops: 2 officers, 46 enlisted
- Complement: 5 officers, 54 enlisted
- Armament: 6 × 20 mm AA gun mounts
- Armour: 10-lb. STS splinter shield to gun mounts, pilot house and conning station

USS LSM-355 was a LSM-1-class landing ship medium in the United States Navy during World War II. The ship was transferred to France as L9011, South Vietnam as RVNS Hát Giang (HQ-400) and Philippines as RPS Western Samar (LP-66).

== Construction and career ==
LSM-355 was laid down on 11 November 1944 at Brown Shipbuilding Co., Houston, Texas, was launched on 2 December 1944 and commissioned on 24 December 1944.

During World War II , LSM-355 was assigned to the Asiatic-Pacific theater. She was assigned to occupation service in the Far East from 2 September to 23 December 1945.

LSM-355 was decommissioned on 23 October 1946, but was recommissioned on 18 September 1950 amid the Korean War. During the war, it supplied air force detachments in Korea and Japan. As such it was awarded battle stars for U.N. Summer-Fall Offensive 1952 (1 to 31 October 1952) and Korean Defense Summer-Fall 1952 (12 to 20 November 1952).

She was put out of service on 11 January 1954 at the Pacific Reserve Fleet and loaned to the French on 22 January 1954.

She was struck from the Navy Register.

The ship was commissioned into the French Navy on 28 June 1954 and renamed L9011. She later took part in the Indo-China War, chartering anti-Communist refugees.

L9011 was then transferred to South Vietnam in December 1955 becoming the RVNS Hát Giang with the pennant number HQ-400, remaining in service during the Vietnam War. In 1966, Hát Giang was converted to a hospital ship. The ship's armament was retained, and additional deckhouses built on Hát Giang's well deck.

During the fall of Vietnam, she escaped to the Philippines on 30 April 1975. The ship was commissioned into the Philippine Navy on 17 November 1975 as RPS Western Samar (LP-66). She was also briefly used as a Floating Medical Facility.

She was put out of service between 1985 and 1989 and sold to a private company to be used as a barge. Her fate is unknown.

== Awards ==
LST-355 have earned the following awards:

- American Campaign Medal
- Asiatic-Pacific Campaign Medal
- World War II Victory Medal
- Navy Occupation Service Medal (with Asia clasp)
- National Defense Service Medal
- Korean Service Medal (2 battle stars)
- United Nations Service Medal
- Republic of Korea War Service Medal

== Sources ==
- Blackman, Raymond V. B., ed. (1971). Jane's Fighting Ships 1971–72. London: Sampson Low, Marston & Co., Ltd. ISBN 0-354-00096-9.
- Friedman, Norman (2002). U.S. Amphibious Ships and Craft: An Illustrated Design History. Annapolis, Maryland, USA. ISBN 1-55750-250-1.
- Moore, John (1984). Jane's Fighting Ships 1984-85. Jane's Information Group. ISBN 978-0710607959.
- Moore, John, ed. (1985). Jane's Fighting Ships 1985–86. London: Jane's Yearbooks. ISBN 0-7106-0814-4.
- Saunders, Stephen (2009). Jane's Fighting Ships 2009-2010. Jane's Information Group. ISBN 978-0710628886.
- Fairplay International Shipping Journal Volume 222. United Kingdom: Fairplay Publishing Limited. 1967.
- United States. Dept. of the Treasury (1962). Treasury Decisions Under the Customs, Internal Revenue, Industrial Alcohol, Narcotic and Other Laws, Volume 97. U.S. Government Printing Office.
