= USS LSM(R)-198 =

LSM(R)-188 class Landing Ship Medium (Rocket)

History

United States
- Laid down: 6 September 1944
- Launched: 14 October 1944
- Commissioned: 12 December 1944
- Decommissioned: 17 January 1946
- Fate: Sold for scrapping, 18 February 1948

General characteristics
- Class & type: LSM(R)-188-class Landing Ship Medium (Rocket)
- Length: 203 ft 6 in (62.03 m)
- Beam: 34 ft (10 m)
- Draft: 5 ft 6 in (1.68 m) forward; 5 ft 9 in (1.75 m) aft
- Propulsion: GM Cleveland diesel engines, 2,800 shp (2,088 kW), direct drive, 2 screws
- Speed: 13.2 knots (24.4 km/h; 15.2 mph)
- Range: 5,000 nmi (9,300 km) at 7 kn (13 km/h; 8.1 mph)
- Complement: 5 officers, 76 enlisted
- Armament: 1 × 5-inch/38-caliber gun; 2 × 40 mm AA guns; 3 × 20 mm AA guns; 85 × Mk. 51 automatic rocket launchers

USS LSM(R)-198 was a Landing Ship Medium (Rocket) of the US Navy during World War II.

It was laid down at Charleston Navy Yard, Charleston, South Carolina. The ship was commissioned on 12 December 1944.

== Service history ==
During World War II the ship was assigned to the Asiatic Pacific theater as part of the Fifth fleet.

The Kerama Retto islands were a small chain of islands 15 miles west of the southwest tip of Okinawa. The invasion of the Kerma Retto was an opportunity to break in all twelve of the 188-class LSM(R)s. One of the reasons that Admiral Turner wanted to capture Kerama Retto was his knowledge that the Japanese Sea Raiding Units had suicide boats hidden there. On the morning of 29 March three of these boats attacked USS LSM(R)-189 but were promptly destroyed. The northern half of the six-mile-wide invasion beach was assigned to Task Force 53, under the command of Rear Admiral Lawrence F. Reifsnider. Embarked were the 1st and 6th Marine Divisions under Major General Roy S. Geiger.

LSM(R)-198 was part of the northern support craft along with USS LSM(R)-194, USS LSM(R)-195, USS LSM(R)-196, USS LSM(R)-197, and USS LSM(R)-199. On 13 April 1945, LSM(R)-192, LSM(R)-193, LSM(R)-196, LSM(R)-197, LSM(R)-198, LSM(R)-199 and LC(FF)-535 were assigned to night harassment and destructive bombardment of Ie Shima. They used irregular rocket fire for destructive harassment together with star shells fired from their 5-inch guns for illumination and harassment. Their 40 mm guns prevented reinforcement of the beach defenses. The night patrols of the surrounding waters prevented any movement or mine laying. On the morning of 16 April, these LSM(R)s were used for rocket attack in support of assault troops. Approximately 2,600 rockets were fired into a large area composed principally of the South Eastern sector of the town of le Shima and the Eastern and South Eastern vicinities of Ie-gushuyama.

=== Battle of Okinawa ===
During the long battle of Okinawa, the LSM(R)s were used to form pickets around the Allied Fleet. These pickets were to give advance warning of Japanese air attack, particularly by kamikaze aircraft. The LSM(R)s were used although their flotilla commander noted their unsuitability for the task.

On 3 May and 4 May, among the losses to kamikaze attacks were USS LSM(R)-195, USS LSM(R)-190 and USS LSM(R)-194.
