= USS Kodiak (LSM-161) =

American landing ship during WWII

History

United States
- Name: USS LSM-161
- Builder: Charleston Navy Yard
- Laid down: 3 June 1944
- Launched: 27 June 1944
- Commissioned: 16 August 1944
- Decommissioned: 8 June 1946
- Recommissioned: 6 September 1950
- Decommissioned: 19 April 1965
- Renamed: USS Kodiak (LSM-161), 14 October 1959
- Stricken: 1 June 1965
- Honors and awards: 2 battle stars (Korea)
- Fate: Sold for scrapping, 14 August 1972

General characteristics
- Class & type: LSM-1-class landing ship medium
- Displacement: 520 long tons (528 t) light; 743 long tons (755 t) landing; 1,095 long tons (1,113 t) full
- Length: 203 ft 6 in (62.03 m)
- Beam: 34 ft 6 in (10.52 m)
- Draft: Light : 3 ft 6 in (1.07 m) forward; 7 ft 8 in (2.34 m) aft; Full load : 6 ft 4 in (1.93 m) forward; 8 ft 3 in (2.51 m) aft
- Propulsion: 2 × General Motors (non-reversing with airflex clutch) diesels, direct drive with 1,440 bhp (1,074 kW) each at 720 rpm, twin screws
- Speed: 13.2 knots (24.4 km/h; 15.2 mph) (928 tons displacement)
- Range: 4,900 nmi (9,100 km) at 12 kn (22 km/h; 14 mph) (928 tons displacement)
- Capacity: 5 medium or 3 heavy tanks, or 6 LVT's, or 9 DUKW's
- Troops: 2 officers, 46 enlisted
- Complement: 5 officers, 54 enlisted
- Armament: 1 × single 40 mm; 4 × single 20 mm AA gun mounts
- Armor: 10-lb. STS splinter shield to gun mounts, pilot house and conning station

USS LSM-161 was a LSM-1-class landing ship medium built for the United States Navy during World War II. Like many of her class, she was not named and was properly referred to by her hull designation for much of her service life.

LSM-161 was laid down on 3 June 1944 by Charleston Navy Yard; launched on 27 June 1944; and commissioned on 16 August 1944.

== Service history ==
=== World War II ===
After serving at Little Creek, Virginia, as a training ship for more than five months, LSM-161 departed Newport, Rhode Island, on 23 February 1945 for the West Coast, arriving San Diego, California on 24 March. Departing on 28 April for the Pacific Theatre, she arrived Saipan on 6 June; then commenced supply operations in the Far East. For the remaining months of World War II, LSM-161 shuttled troops and cargo among the Philippines, Okinawa, and the Marianas. Following the Allied victory in the Pacific, the medium landing ship supported occupation forces in the Western Pacific until she sailed for the United States on 12 December. Arriving San Pedro, California, on 12 January 1946, LSM-161 remained along the West Coast; and decommissioned at Vancouver, Washington, on 8 June 1946.

=== Korean War ===
When the Korean War called for additional naval logistic support, LSM-161 recommissioned on 6 September 1950 and was assigned to LSM Division 12 out of San Diego. She operated off southern California until 11 February 1952 when she sailed for the Western Pacific. Arriving Yokosuka, Japan on 26 March, she commenced supply and transport operations in support of U.S. forces in Korea. Sailing to Pusan, Korea in mid-April, the landing ship embarked prisoners-of-war and transported them to Koje Do. She continued operations between Japan and South Korea until she departed Yokosuka, on 20 September for the United States.

=== USS Kodiak ===
Following operations out of San Diego, LSM-161 sailed for Kodiak, Alaska, on 16 June 1953. Arriving there a week later, she became a logistics support ship for the Alaskan area. From 1953 to 1965 she provided services for VP Squadrons at Kodiak; performed search and rescue missions; and made frequent resupply cruises to the Adak Naval Station. LSM-161 was renamed USS Kodiak (LSM-161) on 14 October 1959.

Kodiak also participated in the Good Friday earthquake relief operations from March to May 1964 by shuttling supplies to remote villages on the island of Kodiak. Later that summer she assisted the American Red Cross in earthquake relief work by carrying supplies and household furnishings to devastated areas.

After many years of naval service and a veteran of two wars, Kodiak decommissioned for the last time on 19 April 1965 and was struck from the Navy List on 1 June 1965. She was sold for scrapping on 14 August 1972, to Tien Hsin Hong.

== Awards ==
LSM-161 received:
Two battle stars for the Korean War.

Her crew was eligible for the following awards:
American Campaign Medal
Asiatic-Pacific Campaign Medal
World War II Victory Medal
Navy Occupation Medal (with Asia clasp)
National Defense Service Medal
Korean Service Medal (2)
United Nations Service Medal
Republic of Korea War Service Medal (retroactive)
