= USS LSM(R)-199 =

1944 LSM(R)-188-class Landing Ship Medium

History

United States
- Laid down: 6 September 1944
- Launched: 14 October 1944
- Commissioned: 12 December 1944
- Decommissioned: 1 February 1946
- Honors and awards: One battle star
- Fate: Sold, 10 March 1948

General characteristics
- Class & type: LSM(R)-188 class Landing Ship Medium
- Length: 203 ft 6 in (62.03 m)
- Beam: 34 ft (10 m)
- Draft: 5 ft 6 in (1.68 m) forward; 5 ft 9 in (1.75 m) aft
- Propulsion: GM Cleveland diesel engines, 2,800 shp (2,088 kW), direct drive, 2 screws
- Speed: 13.2 knots (24.4 km/h; 15.2 mph)
- Range: 5,000 nmi (9,300 km) at 7 kn (13 km/h; 8.1 mph)
- Complement: 5 officers, 76 enlisted
- Armament: 1 × 5-inch/38-caliber gun; 2 × 40 mm AA guns; 3 X 20 mm AA guns]; 85 × Mk. 51 automatic rocket launchers

LSM(R)-199 was a LSM(R)-188 class Landing Ship Medium (Rocket) of the US Navy during World War II. laid down at Charleston Navy Yard, Charleston, South Carolina, The ship was commissioned on 12 December 1944.

== Service history (Turner) ==
During World War II the ship was assigned to the Asiatic Pacific theater. At that time the fleet was under the command of Admiral Spruance and named the Fifth fleet. Vice Admiral Richmond Kelly Turner was Commander of Amphibious Forces Pacific and was to be in charge of operations until the beachhead was established. The Kerama Retto islands were a small chain of islands 15 miles west of the southwest tip of Okinawa. The invasion of the Kerma Retto was an opportunity to break in all twelve of the 188-class LSM(R)s. One of the reasons that Admiral Turner wanted to capture Kerama Retto was his knowledge that the Japanese Sea Raiding Units had suicide boats hidden there. On the morning of 29 March three of these boats attacked the USS LSM(R)-189 but were promptly destroyed. The northern half of the six-mile-wide invasion beach was assigned to Task Force 53, under the command of Rear Admiral Lawrence F. Reifsnider. Embarked were the 1st and 6th Marine Divisions under Major General Roy S. Geiger. The LSMs involved, as part of the Northern Tractor Flotilla were LSMs 84, 162, 166, 175, 220, 228, 246, 265, 270, 271, 274, 277, 278, 325, and 326. The northern support craft included USS LSM(R)-194, USS LSM(R)-195, USS LSM(R)-196, USS LSM(R)-197, USS LSM(R)-198, and LSM(R)-199. On 13 April 1945 LSM(R)'S 192, 193, 196, 197, 198 199 and LC(FF) 535 were assigned to night harassment and destructive bombardment of Ie Shima. These LSM(R)'S utilized irregular rocket fire for destructive harassment 5" star shell for illumination and harassment, and 40 mm to prevent reinforcement of the beach defenses. The night patrols of the surrounding waters prevented any movement or mine laying. On morning of 16 April, these LSM(R)'s were used for rocket attack in support of assault troops. Approximately 2600 rockets were fired into a large area composed principally of the South Eastern sector of the town of le and the Eastern and South Eastern vicinities of Ie-gushuyama.

== Okinawa Radar Picket Line (C.T.G. 52.21) ==
The American plan for defense against the kamikazes was to have fighters intercept the Japanese as early as possible. Sixteen radar picket stations were established around the island, in some cases almost 100 miles out, to give early warning of the Japanese planes which might be coming from any direction. Each station was manned around the clock by a handful of ships ranging from destroyers down to minesweepers. Their job was to sound the alarm and vector fighters to intercept before the Japanese could attack the fleet anchored off Okinawa and the Allied forces and supply dumps ashore. Unfortunately, some of the eager-to-die Japanese wanted to attack the first American ships they saw: the pickets. Dennis L. Francis LSM Commander, Flotilla Nine for the period 2–20 April, Action Report indicated that . . ."these ships are not particularly suited for picket duty. Since their primary function is to deliver rockets during invasion operations, it seems feasible that subjecting them to continual enemy air attack will allow this secondary duty to seriously effect their ability to perform their primary function due to damage. They have no great value in combating enemy air craft due to the absence of air search radar, adequate director control for the 5"/38 main battery, and director control for the 40mm single guns. The fact that they carry a considerable quantity of explosive rockets in their magazines presents another hazard. In general, it is believed that assigning them to picket duty should be avoided since it means risking the operation of a limited number of specialized ships which could be performed by any number of other landing craft whose primary function is more closely coincident with screening operations." Before these recommendations were implemented the USS LSMR-195 was sunk on 3 May 1945 with 9 killed and 16 wounded, the USS LSMR-190 was sunk on 4 May 1945 with 13 killed and 18 wounded, the USS LSMR-194 was sunk on 4 May 1945 with 13 killed and 23 wounded.
