= USS Luce (DD-522) =

Fletcher-class destroyer

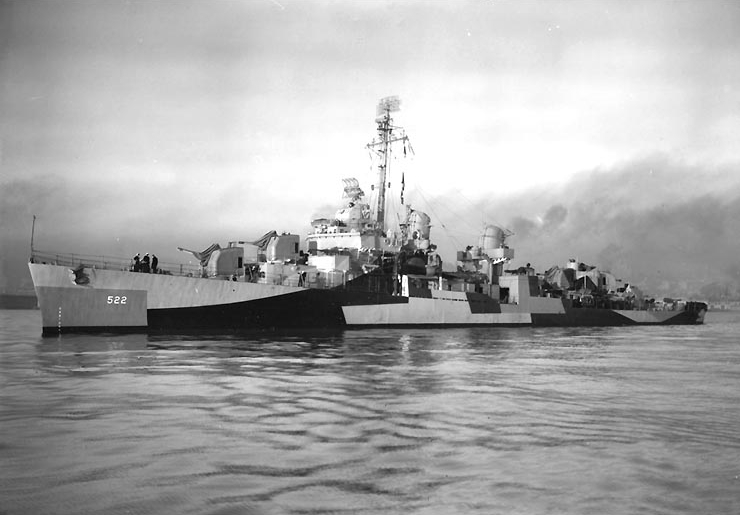
- In 1944, while wearing Camouflage Measure 32, Design 18D.

History

United States
- Name: Luce
- Namesake: Stephen B. Luce
- Builder: Bethlehem Mariners Harbor, Staten Island
- Laid down: 24 August 1942
- Launched: 6 March 1943
- Commissioned: 21 June 1943
- Fate: Sunk by kamikazes, 4 May 1945

General characteristics
- Class & type: Fletcher-class destroyer
- Displacement: 2,050 tons
- Length: 376 ft 6 in (114.7 m)
- Beam: 39 ft 8 in (12.1 m)
- Draft: 17 ft 9 in (5.4 m)
- Propulsion: 60,000 shp (45 MW); 2 propellers
- Speed: 35 knots (65 km/h; 40 mph)
- Range: 6500 nmi. (12,000 km) at 15 kt
- Complement: 336
- Armament: 5 × single Mk 12 5 in (127 mm)/38 guns; 5 × twin 40 mm (1.6 in) Bofors AA guns; 7 × single 20 mm (0.8 in) Oerlikon AA guns; 2 × quintuple 21 in (533 mm) torpedo tubes; 6 × single depth charge throwers; 2 × depth charge racks

USS Luce (DD-522), a Fletcher-class destroyer, was the second ship of the United States Navy to be named for Rear Admiral Stephen B. Luce (1827–1917).

Luce was laid down by Bethlehem Steel Co., Staten Island, N.Y., 24 August 1942; launched 6 March 1943, sponsored by Mrs. Stephen B. Luce Jr., wife of Rear Adm. Stephen B. Luce's grandson; and commissioned 21 June 1943.

== History ==
Luce departed New York 5 September 1943 and arrived Bremerton, Wash., 28 October after visiting Trinidad and San Diego en route. She departed 1 November for Pearl Harbor as plane guard for Enterprise (CV-6), and conducted gunnery training exercises in the Hawaiian Islands until 24 November. She then steamed to Adak Island, Alaska, and from 30 November 1943 to 8 August 1944 engaged in patrol and ASW duties off Attu Island. This duty was interrupted 1 February 1944 when she sailed from Massacre Bay, Attu, to participate in the 3 to 4 February bombardment of Paramushiru, Kurile Islands, with Task Force 94 (TF 94) of the Northern Pacific Force. Completely surprising the enemy, the attack was successful; Luce destroyed a 2,000-ton enemy freighter in the action. She returned to Attu 4 February and resumed patrol. On 13 June Luce, with TF 94, bombarded Matsuwa, Kurile Islands, and 26 June attacked Paramushiru a second time. On 8 August the ship departed for San Francisco and returned to Pearl Harbor 31 August.

As a unit of the Southern Attack Force, TF 79, Luce sortied from Manus, Admiralty Islands, 11 October. During the assault on Leyte 20 to 23 October, she patrolled outside the LST-transport areas providing air cover. Between 1 November and 12 December, Luce sailed from Manus to New Guinea on escort and ASW patrols, and from 12 to 27 December supported the Huon Gulf, New Guinea, landing operations. On 27 December she got underway to screen transports for the Lingayen Gulf attack and landings.

She arrived in the operating area 9 January 1945 screening LSTs and transports of TF 78. She fended off all enemy attackers and succeeded in shooting down one on the 11th. In company with 40 other ships, Luce departed 11 January and fought her way victoriously to San Pedro Bay 16 January. The ship patrolled this area until 25 January when she departed for the assault on San Antonio, San Felipe area, Luzon. This operation was unopposed, and Luce sailed for Mindoro 30 January. From 2 February to 24 March she escorted resupply convoys between Subic Bay and San Pedro Bay.

== Fate ==
On 24 March 1945 she departed Leyte escorting and screening units of TF 51 which landed heavy artillery on Kelse Shima for the support of the main landings on Okinawa. She was detached from this duty 1 April and assigned radar picket duty off Kerama Retto. About 07:40, 4 May, Japanese kamikaze (suicide) planes were intercepted by the combat air patrol in the vicinity of Luce. Two enemy planes avoided the interceptors and attacked her from the portside. Luce shot down one, but the explosion from the bomb it carried caused a power failure. Unable to bring her guns to bear in time, she was struck in the aft section by the second kamikaze. The port engine was knocked out, engineering spaces flooded, and the rudder jammed. At 08:14 Luce took a heavy list to starboard and the order to abandon ship was passed. Moments later she slid beneath the surface in a violent explosion carrying 126 of her 312 officers and men with her.

== Honors ==
Luce received five battle stars for World War II service.
