= USS LSM(R)-195 =

Landing ship sunk in 1945

- LSM(R)-195 launching, 7 October 1944, at Charleston Navy Yard

History

United States
- Laid down: 29 August 1944
- Launched: 7 October 1944
- Commissioned: 21 November 1944
- Honours and awards: One Battle Star
- Fate: Sunk by a Japanese kamikaze plane, 3 May 1945

General characteristics
- Class & type: LSM(R)-188-class Landing Ship Medium (Rocket)
- Length: 203 ft 6 in (62.03 m)
- Beam: 34 ft (10 m)
- Draft: 5 ft 6 in (1.68 m) forward; 5 ft 9 in (1.75 m) aft
- Propulsion: GM Cleveland diesel engines, 2,800 shp (2,088 kW), direct drive, 2 screws
- Speed: 13.2 knots (24.4 km/h; 15.2 mph)
- Range: 5,000 nmi (9,300 km) at 7 kn (13 km/h; 8.1 mph)
- Complement: 5 officers, 76 enlisted
- Armament: 1 × 5-inch/38-caliber gun; 2 × 40 mm AA guns; 3 × 20 mm AA guns; 75 × 4-rail Mk. 36 rocket launchers; 30 × 6-rail Mk. 30 rocket launchers (Removed early April 1945)

LSM(R)-195 was laid down at Charleston Navy Yard. The ship was commissioned on 21 November 1944.

== Service history (Turner & Woodson) ==
During World War II the ship was assigned to the Asiatic Pacific theater. At that time the fleet was under the command of Admiral Spruance and named the Fifth Fleet. Vice Admiral Richmond Kelly Turner was Commander of Amphibious Forces Pacific and was to be in charge of operations until the beachhead was established. The Kerama Retto islands were a small chain of islands 15 miles west of the southwest tip of Okinawa. The invasion of the Kerma Retto was an opportunity to break in all twelve of the 188-class LSM(R)s. One of the reasons that Admiral Turner wanted to capture Kerama Retto was his knowledge that the Japanese Sea Raiding Units had suicide boats hidden there. On the morning of 29 March three of these boats attacked the USS LSM(R)-189 but were promptly destroyed. The northern half of the six-mile-wide invasion beach was assigned to Task Force 53, under the command of Rear Admiral Lawrence F. Reifsnider. Embarked were the 1st and 6th Marine Divisions under Major General Roy S. Geiger. The northern support craft included USS LSM(R)-194, USS LSM(R)-195, USS LSM(R)-196, USS LSM(R)-197, USS LSM(R)-198, and USS LSM(R)-199.

On 3 May 1945 the 188-class LSM(R)s were put to the test when the Japanese launched their fifth kikusui attack on 3 May. Picket station 10 was the hardest hit. Shortly before dusk, the destroyer USS Aaron Ward (DM-34) was hit by a series of six kamikazes, suffering 45 killed or missing and 49 wounded. The ship survived, but was later decommissioned because it wasn't worth repairing. About the same time, approximately 20 planes attacked destroyer USS Little (DD-803). She was crashed by four of them and sank within 12 minutes of the first hit. She lost 30 dead or missing and 79 wounded. LSM(R)-195 was also on Picket Station 10 and while rushing to the aid of Aaron Ward and Little was likewise crashed by a kamikaze. The crash started her rockets exploding and knocked out the fire main and auxiliary pumps. LSM(R)-195 had to be abandoned and, after being ripped by heavy explosions, sank. The following day the ordeal for the LSM(R)'s reached its tragic climax. USS LSM(R)-190 was patrolling at Picket Station 12. Not long after sunrise the anticipated kamikazes arrived and were met by American combat air patrol. Several of the Japanese planes managed to get through and attack the ships on this station. Three kamikazes crashed LSM(R)-190. The ship that had seen so much previous action and had been credited with rescuing 180 survivors of other stricken ships was herself sunk. In the same attack the destroyer USS Luce (DD-522) was sunk, carrying 126 of her 312 officers and men with her. At the same time as LSM(R)-190 was fighting her final battle, LSM(R)-194 was facing the same fate at Picket Station 1.

W.E. Woodson CO LSM(R)-195 survived the sinking and reported on 5 May 1945: Two planes were observed approaching, the closest identified as NICK. This plane was taken under fire by the 5"/38 and both 40MM guns as he circled and approached from the starboard. The other plane, started an attack run on our port side coming in at a very low altitude and maneuvering violently to confuse our two port 20MM gunners who had taken him under fire. This plane was strafing on its way in and hit the port side ripping the main deck all the way into midships.

The explosion and depth of damage indicated that this plane carried a bomb. The rockets that were loaded in the launchers topside began exploding in every direction as the fire spread from one broken rocket motor to another causing a great deal of shrapnel and fragments to be in the air at all times. These rockets were propelled only short distances with numerous hits about the deck causing fires. The plane or bomb had also penetrated the forward assembly room causing assembled rockets to be propelled throughout the ship and the area surrounding it.
