= USS Aaron Ward (DM-34) =

Robert H. Smith-class destroyer minelayer

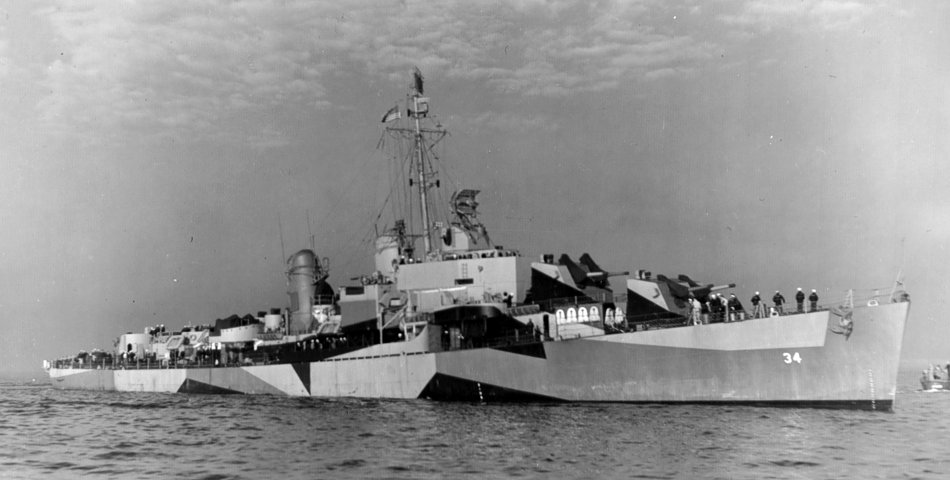
- Aaron Ward in camouflage measure 32, design 11a

History

United States
- Name: Aaron Ward
- Namesake: Aaron Ward
- Builder: Bethlehem Shipbuilding, San Pedro, California
- Laid down: 12 December 1943
- Launched: 5 May 1944
- Commissioned: 28 October 1944
- Decommissioned: 28 September 1945
- Fate: Sold for scrap 1946

General characteristics
- Class & type: Robert H. Smith-class destroyer
- Displacement: 2,200 tons
- Length: 376 ft 6 in (114.76 m)
- Beam: 40 ft 10 in (12.45 m)
- Draft: 18 ft 10 in (5.74 m)
- Speed: 34 knots (63 km/h; 39 mph)
- Complement: 363 officers and enlisted
- Armament: 6 x 5 in (127 mm)/38 cal. guns; 12 x 40 mm guns; 8 x 20 mm cannons; 2 x depth charge tracks; 4 x depth charge projectors; 80 mines

The third ship named USS Aaron Ward (DD-773/DM-34) in honor of Rear Admiral Aaron Ward was a Robert H. Smith-class destroyer minelayer in the service of the United States Navy.

She was laid down as an Allen M. Sumner-class destroyer (DD-773) on 12 December 1943 at San Pedro, California by the Bethlehem Shipbuilding and launched on 5 May 1944, sponsored by Mrs. G. H. Ratliff. The ship was redesignated a destroyer minelayer, DM-34, on 19 July 1944, and commissioned on 28 October 1944.

== Service history ==
Between commissioning and the end of January 1945, Aaron Ward completed fitting out and conducted her shakedown cruise off the California coast. On 9 February, she departed San Pedro, bound for Pearl Harbor, arriving on 15 February. The warship conducted additional training in Hawaiian waters, before loading supplies and ammunition and getting underway on 5 March to join the 5th Fleet at Ulithi. She entered the lagoon of that atoll in the Western Carolines on 16 March, but put to sea again on 19 March with Task Force 52, bound for the Ryūkyū Islands.

The Mine Flotilla, of which Aaron Ward was a unit, arrived off Okinawa late on 22 March. The first enemy air raid occurred on 26 March, and Adams knocked the intruder out of the sky.

Aaron Ward supported minesweeping operations around Kerama Retto and Okinawa until the first landings. During that period, she accounted for three enemy aircraft. On 1 April, the day of the initial assault on Okinawa, the destroyer minelayer began screening the heavy warships providing gunfire support for the troops ashore. That duty lasted until 4 April, when she headed for the Marianas. She arrived at Saipan on 10 April, but sailed to Guam later that day. After several days of minor repairs, Aaron Ward headed back to Okinawa to patrol in the area around Kerama Retto. During that patrol period, she came under frequent air attack. On 27 April, she shot down one enemy plane, and the next day accounted for one more and also claimed a probable kill. Then she returned to Kerama Retto to replenish her provisions and fuel. While she was there, a kamikaze scored a hit on Pinkney. Aaron Ward moved alongside the stricken evacuation transport to help fight the inferno blazing amidships. She also rescued 12 survivors from Pinkney.

On 30 April, she returned to sea to take up position on radar picket station number 10. That night, she helped repel several air attacks; But, for the most part, weather kept enemy airpower away until the afternoon of 3 May. When the weather began to clear, the probability of air attacks rose. At about dusk, Aaron Ward's radar picked up bogies at 27 miles (43 km) distance. Two of the planes in the formation broke away and began runs on Aaron Ward. The warship opened fire on the first from about 7,000 yards (6,000 m) and began scoring hits when he had closed range to 4,000 yards (4,000 m). At that point, he dipped over into his suicide dive, but crashed about 100 yards (100 m) off the ship's starboard quarter. The second began his approach immediately thereafter. Aaron Ward opened fire at about 8,000 yards (7,000 m) and destroyed him while he was still 1,200 yards (1,100 m) away.

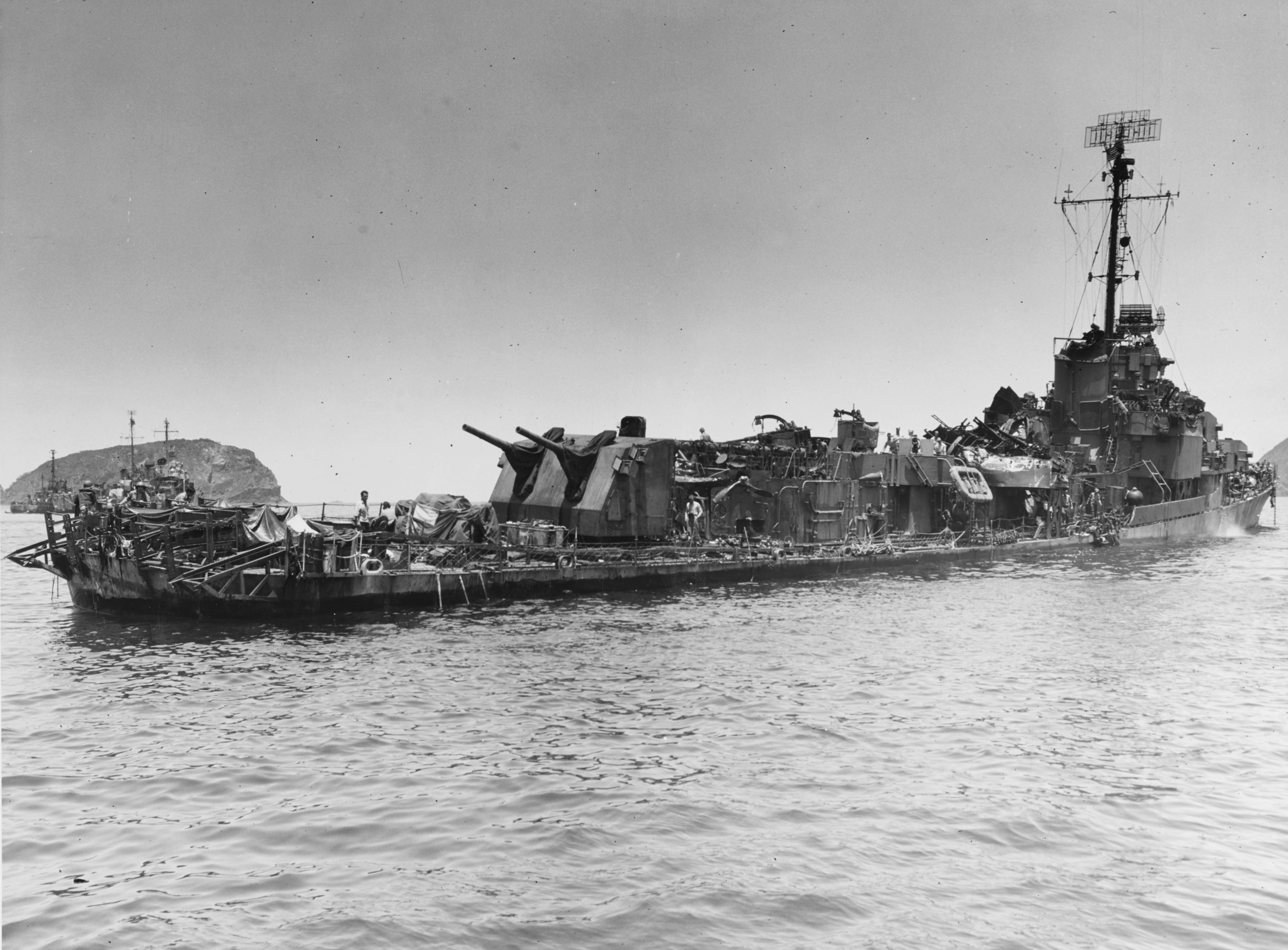
USS Aaron Ward (DM-34) damaged by kamikazes, May 1945

At that point, a third intruder appeared and dove in on Aaron Ward's stern. Though repeatedly struck by antiaircraft fire, the plane pressed home the attack. Just before crashing into Aaron Ward's superstructure, he released a bomb which smashed through her hull below the waterline and exploded in the after engine room. The explosion flooded the after engine and fire rooms, ruptured fuel tanks, set the leaking oil ablaze, and severed steering control connections to the bridge. The rudder jammed at hard left, and Aaron Ward turned in a tight circle while slowing to about 20 knots (37 km/h). Topside, the plane itself spread fire and destruction through the area around the after deckhouse and deprived mount 53 of all power and communication. Many sailors were killed or injured by the crash.

For about 20 minutes, no enemy plane succeeded in penetrating her air defenses. Damage control parties worked feverishly to put out fires, repair what damage they could, jettison ammunition in danger of exploding, and attend to the wounded. Though steering control was moved aft to the rudder itself, the ship was unable to maneuver properly throughout the remainder of the engagement. Then, at about 18:40, the ships on her station came under a particularly ferocious air attack. While Little was hit by five successive crashes that sank her, LSM(R)-195 was sunk by a single kamikaze hit; and LCS(L)-25 lost her mast to a kamikaze. Just before 19:00, one plane from the group of attackers targeted Aaron Ward and began his approach from about 8,000 yards (7,000 m). However, the ship shot down the attacker when he was still 2,000 yards (2,000 m) away. Another enemy then attempted to crash into her, but they, too, succumbed to her antiaircraft fire.

Soon after, two more Japanese planes came in on her port bow. Though chased by American fighters, one of them succeeded in breaking away and starting a run on Aaron Ward. The aircraft came in at a steep dive apparently aiming at the bridge. Heavy defensive fire, however, forced the plane to veer toward the after portion of the ship. Passing over the signal bridge, the plane carried away halyards and antennae assemblies, smashed into the stack, and then crashed close aboard to starboard.

Quickly on the heels of that attack, still another intruder swooped in toward Aaron Ward. Coming in just forward of her port beam, the plane was met with a hail of anti-aircraft fire, but continued on and released a bomb just before crashing into her main deck. The bomb exploded a few feet close aboard her port side; its fragments showered the ship and blew a large hole through the shell plating near her forward fireroom. As a result, the ship lost all power and gradually lost headway. At that point, a previously unobserved enemy crashed into the ship's deckhouse bulkhead, causing numerous fires and injuring and killing many more crewmen.

Aaron Ward endured two more crashes. At about 19:21, a plane glided in steeply on her port quarter. The loss of power prevented any of her 5-inch mounts from bearing on him, and he crashed into her port side superstructure. Burning gasoline engulfed the deck, 40-millimeter ammunition began exploding, and still more heavy casualties resulted. The warship went dead in the water, her after superstructure deck demolished, and she was still on fire. While damage control crews fought the fires and flooding, Aaron Ward began to settle in the water and took on a decided list to port.

Just after 19:20, a final attacker made a high-speed, low-level approach and crashed into the base of her number 2 stack. The explosion blew the plane, the stack, searchlight, and two gun mounts into the air, and they all came to rest strewn across the deck aft of stack number 1. Through the night, her crew fought to save the ship. At 2106, Shannon arrived and took Aaron Ward in tow. Early on the morning of 4 May, she arrived at Kerama Retto, where she began temporary repairs. She remained there until 11 June, when she got underway for the United States. Steaming via Ulithi, Guam, Eniwetok, Pearl Harbor, and the Panama Canal, Aaron Ward arrived in New York in mid-August.

On 28 September 1945, because her damage was so severe and the Navy had a surplus of destroyers at the time, she was decommissioned, and her name was struck from the Navy list. In July 1946, she was sold for scrapping. Her anchor is on display in Elgin, Illinois.

== Awards ==
Aaron Ward earned one battle star and the Presidential Unit Citation for her World War II service.
