= Lawrence Fairfax Reifsnider =

American football player and US Navy admiral (1887–1956)

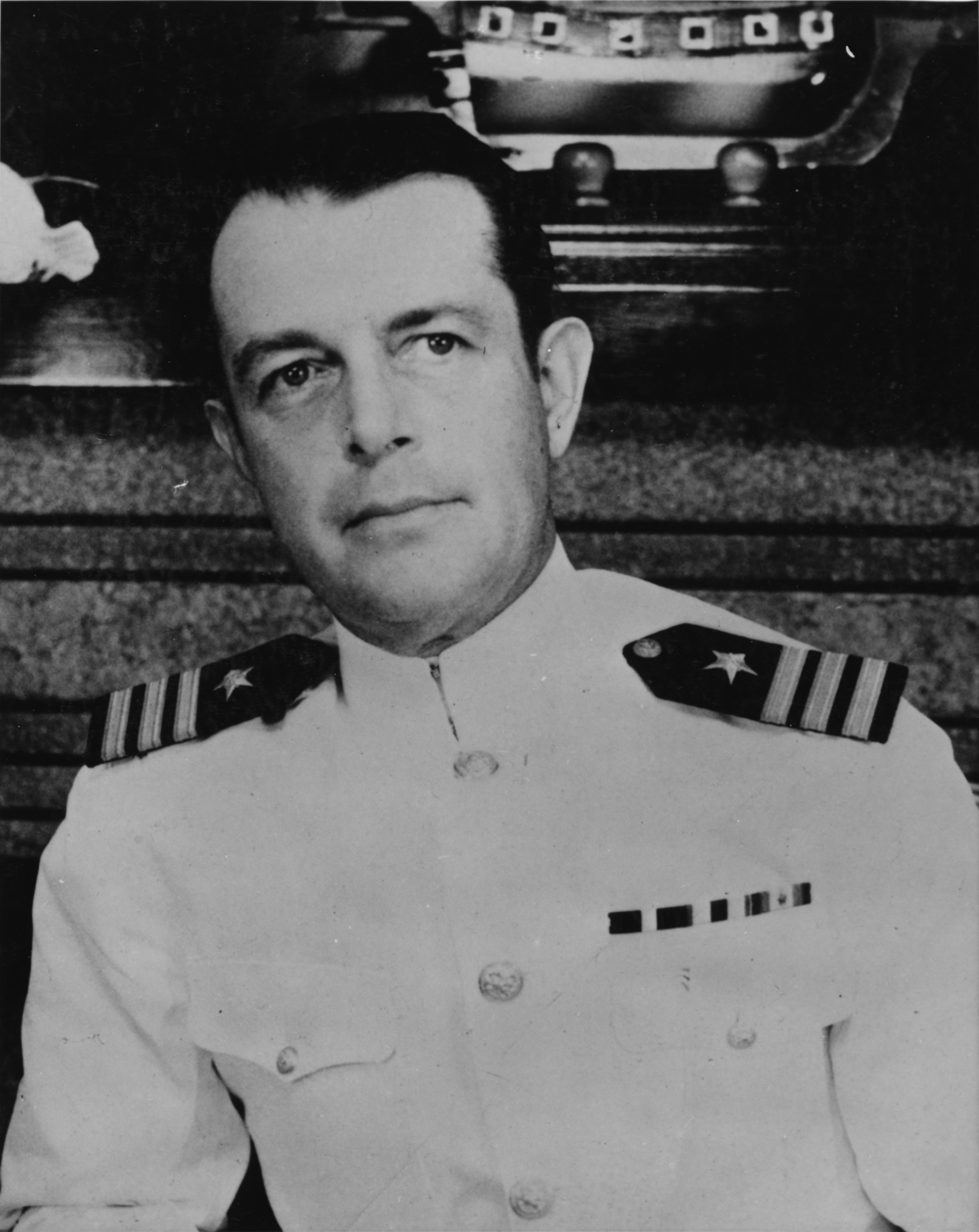
- Lawrence F. Reifsnider in 1932

Navy Midshipmen
- Position: End
- Class: 1910

Personal information
- Born: November 26, 1887; Westminster, Maryland, U.S.
- Died: May 14, 1956 (age 68); San Diego, California, U.S.

Career information
- College: U.S. Naval Academy

Awards and highlights
- Second-team All-American (1908)

Other information
- Military career
- Allegiance: United States
- Branch: United States Navy
- Service years: 1910–1949
- Rank: Vice Admiral
- Conflicts: World War I World War II
- Awards: Navy Cross; Distinguished Service Medal (3); Legion of Merit

Lawrence Fairfax Reifsnider (November 26, 1887 – May 14, 1956) was an American football player and a vice admiral in the United States Navy. A native of Westminster, Maryland, Reifsnider attended the United States Naval Academy where he played college football at the end position for the Navy Midshipmen football team. He was selected by Walter Camp in 1908 as a second-team All-American. He graduated in 1910 and was commissioned as an ensign on March 7, 1912.

After graduating from the Naval Academy, Reifsnider served in the United States Navy until December 1949, attaining the rank of vice admiral. He served as a submarine commander in World War I, aboard the USS O-5 and USS E-2 submarines, and was awarded the Navy Cross. He later commanded the cruiser USS Memphis, served as chief of the United States Naval Mission in Colombia, as chief of the Pacific Fleet Amphibious Training Command, and as commandant of the Eighth Naval district in New Orleans. He received the Legion of Merit and three Distinguished Service Medals for his service in World War II leading amphibious landing transport forces in the Pacific theatre.

He lived in Coronado, California after his retirement and died at the Naval Hospital in San Diego. Reifsnider and his wife Louise (Munroe) Reifsnider (July 22, 1887 – September 17, 1969) were interred at Fort Rosecrans National Cemetery.
