= USS Little (DD-803) =

Fletcher-class destroyer

Coordinates: 26.4°N 126.25°E

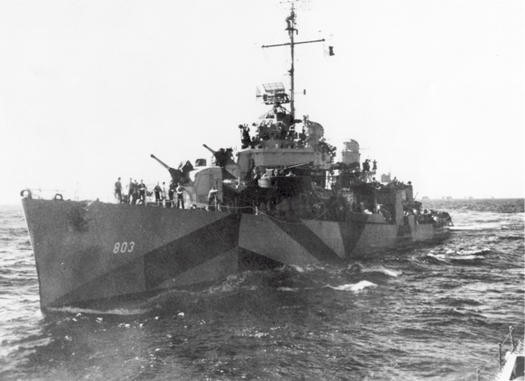
- USS Little (DD-803)

History

United States
- Name: Little
- Namesake: George Little
- Builder: Seattle-Tacoma Shipbuilding Corporation, Seattle
- Laid down: 13 September 1943
- Launched: 22 May 1944
- Commissioned: 19 August 1944
- Fate: Sunk by Kamikaze, 3 May 1945

General characteristics
- Class & type: Fletcher-class destroyer
- Displacement: 2,050 tons
- Length: 376 ft 5 in (114.7 m)
- Beam: 39 ft in (12.1 m)
- Draft: 13 ft 9 in (4.2 m)
- Propulsion: 60,000 shp (45 MW); 2 propellers
- Speed: 35 knots (65 km/h; 40 mph)
- Range: 6500 nmi. (12,000 km); @ 15 kt
- Complement: 329
- Armament: 5 × 5 in (130 mm), 10 × 40 mm AA guns, 7 × 20 mm AA guns, 10 × 21 inch (533 mm) torpedo tubes, 6 × depth charge projectors, 2 × depth charge tracks

USS Little (DD-803), a Fletcher-class destroyer, was the second ship of the United States Navy to be named for Captain George Little (1754–1809).

Little was laid down by Seattle-Tacoma Shipbuilding Corp., Seattle, Wash., 13 September 1943; launched 22 May 1944, sponsored by Mrs. Russell F. O'Hara; and commissioned 19 August 1944.

== History ==
After training off the West Coast, Little departed Seattle 11 November 1944 to escort a convoy to Pearl Harbor. She arrived 23 November and participated in gunnery training and battle problems. On 22 January 1945 she got underway with a group of LSTs for Eniwetok and rehearsals for the invasion of Iwo Jima. Final preparations were made at Saipan, and 15 February Little sailed for the assault beaches.

Shore bombardment at Iwo Jima began 19 February. Little furnished fire support for ground forces until the 24th when she left for Saipan. She returned 4 March for bombardment, screening, and radar picket duties, and was back at Saipan 14 March to prepare for the Okinawa invasion.

Little sailed for Okinawa 27 March assigned to the demonstration group charged with feigning landings opposite the actual assault beaches. After accomplishing this diversion 1 and 2 April, Little screened transports and escorted LSTs to the beaches. On 19 April she was ordered to picket duty where she remained until 24 April—unscathed despite relentless enemy suicide attacks.

On 3 May Little and Aaron Ward (DM-34) were again on picket duty. At 18:13 hours, 18 to 24 aircraft attacked from under cloud cover. Aaron Ward took the first hit at 18:41. An instant later Little was hit on the portside. Within four minutes three more enemy kamikazes had hit her, breaking her keel, demolishing the amidship section, and opening all three after machinery spaces. At 19:55 Little broke up and sank. Thirty-one of the Little's approximately 320 crew members perished, while another 49 suffered injuries.

Little received two battle stars for World War II service.
