= USS LSM(R)-194 =

1944 LSM(R)-188-class Landing Ship Medium (Rocket)

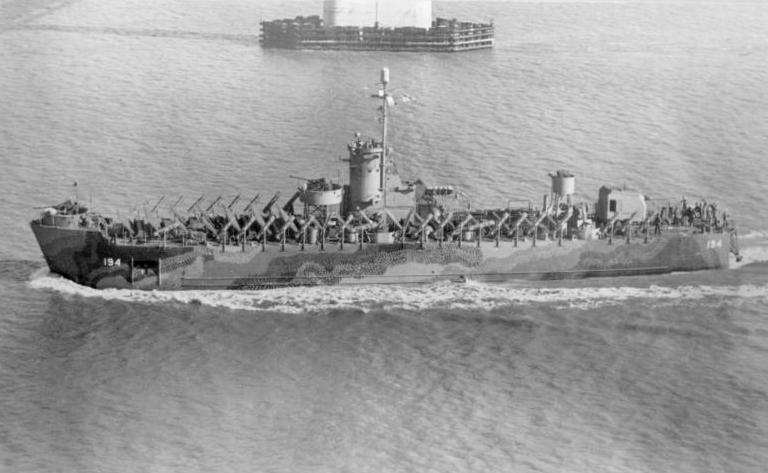
- USS LSM(R)-194 port broadside view, passing under the Cooper River Bridge, Charleston, SC, 2 December 1944.

History

United States
- Laid down: 29 August 1944
- Launched: 7 October 1944
- Commissioned: 21 November 1944
- Decommissioned: 26 February 1946
- Honors and awards: One Battle Star; One Navy Unit Commendation
- Fate: Sunk by a Japanese kamikaze plane, 4 May 1945

General characteristics
- Class & type: LSM(R)-188-class Landing Ship Medium (Rocket)
- Length: 203 ft 6 in (62.03 m)
- Beam: 34 ft (10 m)
- Draft: 5 ft 6 in (1.68 m) forward; 5 ft 9 in (1.75 m) aft
- Propulsion: GM Cleveland diesel engines, 2,800 shp (2,088 kW), direct drive, 2 screws
- Speed: 13.2 knots (24.4 km/h; 15.2 mph)
- Range: 5,000 nmi (9,300 km) at 7 kn (13 km/h; 8.1 mph)
- Complement: 5 officers, 76 enlisted
- Armament: 1 × 5-inch/38-caliber gun; 2 × 40 mm AA guns; 3 × 20 mm AA guns; 75 four-rail Mark 36 rocket launchers; 30 × 6-rail Mark 30 rocket launchers mounted along the gunwales (removed early April 1945)

USS LSM(R)-194 was a LSM(R)-188-class Landing Ship Medium (Rocket) of the United States Navy during World War II, which took part in the Battle of Okinawa. LSM(R)-194 was laid down at the Charleston Navy Yard, Charleston, South Carolina on 21 November 1944. It sank on 4 May 1945 when it was hit by a Japanese suicide plane while on radar picket duty.

== Service history ==
During World War II, the ship was assigned to the Asiatic Pacific theater. At that time, the fleet was under the command of Admiral Spruance and named the Fifth Fleet. Vice Admiral Richmond Kelly Turner was Commander of Amphibious Forces Pacific and was to be in charge of operations until the beachhead was established. At 1840 on 26 March 1945, USS Halligan (DD-584) struck a floating mine which exploded her two forward 5"/38 magazines and her forward boiler. There was a tremendous explosion which sent a column of smoke and flame several hundred yards into the air. As soon as the smoke cleared we saw that the destroyer was still afloat. She circled erratically and moved forward at a slow rate. We immediately sounded general quarters and broke out fire hoses. The order left full rudder was given and we proceeded at full speed to her assistance. Two or three survivors were noted in the water about one half-mile off our starboard and LSM(R)-195 was directed to pick them up. Upon arriving at the scene we saw that her hull forward of the first stack (including the bridge structure) had been blown away. We tied up alongside her starboard side and played hoses on the few flames forward. Our Pharmacist's Mate directed the evacuation of the injured. Many dead bodies were noticed on deck. The surviving Radar Gear was apparently jettisoned. One of the 3 PCs tied up alongside the destroyer's port side and began evacuating survivors. Our ship took aboard seventy-two men, two of whom were seriously wounded. The PC evacuated approximately the same number, and LSMR-195 picked up two men from the water. The Kerama Retto islands were a small chain of islands 15 miles west of the southwest tip of Okinawa. The invasion of the Kerma Retto was an opportunity to break in all twelve of the 188-class LSM(R)s. One of the reasons that Admiral Turner wanted to capture Kerama Retto was his knowledge that the Japanese Sea Raiding Units had suicide boats hidden there. On the morning of 29 March three of these boats, called kaiten, attacked the USS LSM(R)-189 but were promptly destroyed. The northern half of the six-mile-wide invasion beach was assigned to Task Force 53, under the command of Rear Admiral Lawrence F. Reifsnider. The northern support craft included LSM(R)194, USS LSM(R)-195, USS LSM(R)-196, USS LSM(R)-197, USS LSM(R)-198, and USS LSM(R)-199. At 1715, 5 April 1945, LSM(R)-194 received 20mm shell holes from an enemy suicide plane as it passed forward of the conning tower. One officer was wounded slightly by a small piece of shrapnel. While on screening patrol off Hagushi Landing Beaches, LSM(R)-197 destroyed OSCAR by 40mm gunfire. LSM(R)-194 while patrolling at radar picket station 10 on 18 April 1945, fired at a Betty with 5"/38" and observed the plane going down in flames.

On 3 May 1945, the 188-class LSM(R)s was put to the test. The Japanese launched their fifth kikusui attack on 3 May. Picket station 10 was the hardest hit. LSM(R)-194 was hit by a kamikaze and soon sank. For her overall performance of duty on the radar picket line the ship was awarded a Navy Unit Commendation.

== Okinawa Radar Picket Line ==
The American plan for defense against the kamikazes was to have fighters intercept the Japanese as early as possible. Sixteen radar picket stations were established around the island, in some cases almost 100 miles out, to give early warning of the Japanese planes which might be coming from any direction. Each station was manned around the clock by a handful of ships ranging from destroyers down to minesweepers. Their job was to sound the alarm and vector fighters to intercept before the Japanese could attack the fleet anchored off Okinawa and the Allied forces and supply dumps ashore. Unfortunately, some of the eager-to-die Japanese wanted to attack the first American ships they saw: the pickets. Dennis L. Francis LSM Commander, Flotilla Nine for the period 2 – 20 April, Action Report indicated that these ships are not particularly suited for picket duty. Since their primary function is to deliver rockets during invasion operations, it seems feasible that subjecting them to continual enemy air attack will allow this secondary duty to seriously effect their ability to perform their primary function due to damage. They have no great value in combating enemy air craft due to the absence of air search radar, adequate director control for the 5"/38 main battery, and director control for the 40mm single guns. The fact that they carry a considerable quantity of explosive rockets in their magazines presents another hazard. In general, it is believed that assigning them to picket duty should be avoided since it means risking the operation of a limited number of specialized ships which could be performed by any number of other landing craft whose primary function is more closely coincident with screening operations. Before these recommendations were implemented, the USS LSMR-195 was sunk on 3 May 1945 with 9 killed and 16 wounded, the USS LSMR-190 was sunk on 4 May 1945 with 13 killed and 18 wounded, and the USS LSMR-194 was sunk on 4 May 1945 with 13 killed and 23 wounded.

== Casualties ==
American casualties at Okinawa were the highest of any campaign against the Japanese. Total casualties were 49,151, of which 12,520 were killed or missing and 36,631 were wounded. Of this number the Navy casualties were 4,907 killed or missing and 4,824 wounded. The ship losses were 36 sunk and 368 damaged, with many of the damaged ships never being returned to combat readiness. Approximately 110,000 Japanese were killed.
