= USS LSM(R)-189 =

1944 LSM(R)-188-class Landing Ship Medium

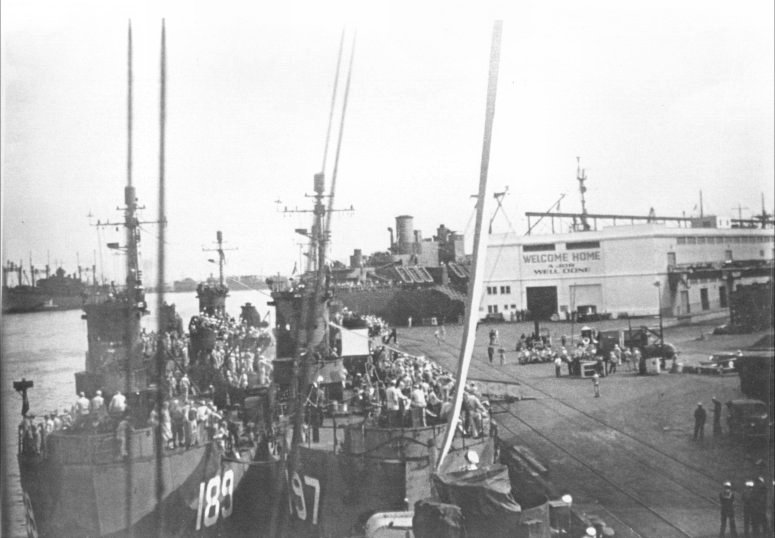
- LSM(R)-189 and LSM(R)-197, two of the seven LSM(R)s comprising Groups 53 and 54 arriving home at the Port of Los Angeles, 8 October 1945, after the conclusion of World War II.

History

United States
- Name: USS LSM(R)-189
- Builder: Charleston Navy Yard, Charleston, South Carolina
- Laid down: 17 August 1944
- Launched: 12 September 1944
- Commissioned: 15 November 1944
- Decommissioned: 31 January 1946
- Fate: Sold for scrap, 17 February 1948

General characteristics
- Class & type: LSM(R)-188-class Landing Ship Medium (Rocket)
- Displacement: 968 long tons (984 t) full
- Length: 203 ft 6 in (62.03 m)
- Beam: 34 ft (10 m)
- Draft: 5 ft 6 in (1.68 m) forward; 5 ft 9 in (1.75 m) aft
- Propulsion: 2 × GM Cleveland diesels, 2,800 shp (2,088 kW), 2 screws
- Speed: 13.2 knots (24.4 km/h; 15.2 mph)
- Range: 5,000 nmi (9,300 km) at 7 kn (13 km/h; 8.1 mph)
- Capacity: 5 medium or 3 heavy tanks, or 6 LVTs or 9 DUKWs
- Complement: 5 officers, 76 enlisted men
- Armament: 1 × 5-inch/38-caliber gun; 2 × 40 mm guns; 3 × 20 mm guns; 75 four-rail Mark 36 automatic rocket launchers on topside rocket deck; Thirty 6-rail Mark 30 launchers mounted along gunwales (removed early April 1945)

Service record
- Operations: Battle of Okinawa
- Awards: 1 battle star; Navy Unit Commendation

USS LSM(R)-189 was a LSM(R)-188 class Landing Ship Medium (rocket) of the United States Navy during World War II. She was commanded by Lieutenant James Malcolm Stewart, USNR during the Battle of Okinawa.

== Service history ==
During World War II, LSM(R)-189 was assigned to the Asiatic-Pacific Theater and participated in the assault and occupation of Okinawa Gunto, from 26 March to 3 June 1945.

On 29 March 1945 the ship was attacked by several Japanese suicide boats and witnessed the kamikaze attack on USS LSM(R)-188.

The ship was damaged when struck by a Japanese kamikaze aircraft on 12 April 1945 while on radar picket duty off Okinawa. She, with USS LSM(R)-190, rescued survivors from USS Mannert L. Abele, after witnessing the sinking by Ohka rocket aircraft.

Decommissioned on 31 January 1946, she was sold for scrap on 17 February 1948 to the National Metal and Steel Corporation, Terminal Island, California.

LSM(R)-189 was awarded the Navy Unit Commendation for her actions off Okinawa and one battle star for World War II service.

== Life Magazine Centerfold ==
The LSM(R) was heralded in Life Magazine in 1945 with a centerfold picture. "Each of these tiny ships had amazing firepower, greater at short range than the combined firepower of two mammoth Iowa class battleships", ran the caption. The interim group of 12 LSM(R)s transited the Panama Canal and via San Diego, Honolulu, and the Philippines, headed for battle against Japan in March 1945. Unaware of their destination, the crews were nonetheless well equipped and trained. In a preliminary assault on 26 March 1945, they laid down a rocket barrage at dawn on Kerama Retta, a small cluster of islands off the southwestern shore of Okinawa. Their objective: to allow the Marines to swiftly land and secure the islands and harbor for the protection of hospital, supply and communication ships, and floating drydocks. The early dawn assault surprised the Japanese. The Marines took control with a minimum of casualties and established this haven for damaged ships.

== Okinawa Radar Picket Line ==
The American plan for defense against the kamikazes was to have fighters intercept the Japanese as early as possible. Sixteen radar picket stations were established around the island, in some cases almost 100 miles out, to give early warning of the Japanese planes which might be coming from any direction. Each station was manned around the clock by a handful of ships ranging from destroyers to minesweepers. Their job was to sound the alarm and vector fighters on to the Japanese before they could attack the fleet anchored off Okinawa and the Allied forces and supply dumps ashore. Unfortunately, some of the eager-to-die Japanese wanted to attack the first American ships they saw: the pickets. Dennis L. Francis LSM Commander, Flotilla Nine for the period 12–26 April, Action Report indicated that:

These ships are not particularly suited for picket duty. Since their primary function is to deliver rockets during invasion operations, it seems feasible that subjecting them to continual enemy air attack will allow this secondary duty to seriously effect their ability to perform their primary function due to damage. They have no great value in combating enemy aircraft due to the absence of air search radar, adequate director control for the 5"/38 main battery and director control for the 40mm single guns. The fact that they carry a considerable quantity of explosive rockets in their magazines presents another hazard. In general, it is believed that assigning them to picket duty should be avoided since it means risking the operation of a limited number of specialized ships which could be performed by any number of other landing craft whose primary function is more closely coincident with screening operations.

Before these recommendations were implemented, USS LSM(R)-195 was sunk on 3 May 1945 with 9 killed and 16 wounded, USS LSMR-190 was sunk on 4 May 1945 with 13 killed and 18 wounded, and USS LSM(R)-194 was sunk on 4 May 1945 with 13 killed and 23 wounded.
