= USS LSM(R)-197 =

1944 LSM(R)-188-class Landing Ship Medium

- LSM(R)-197 firing rockets at Okinawa, sometime between 26 March and 18 June 1945.

History

United States
- Laid down: 13 September 1944
- Launched: 12 October 1944
- Commissioned: 8 December 1944
- Decommissioned: 13 February 1946
- Fate: Sold, 3 February 1948

General characteristics
- Class & type: LSM(R)-188-class Landing Ship Medium (Rocket)
- Length: 203 ft 6 in (62.03 m)
- Beam: 34 ft (10 m)
- Draft: 5 ft 6 in (1.68 m) forward; 5 ft 9 in (1.75 m) aft
- Propulsion: GM Cleveland diesel engines, 2,800 shp (2,088 kW), direct drive, 2 screws
- Speed: 13.2 knots (24.4 km/h; 15.2 mph)
- Range: 5,000 nmi (9,300 km) at 7 kn (13 km/h; 8.1 mph)
- Complement: 5 officers, 76 enlisted
- Armament: 1 × 5-inch/38-caliber gun; 2 × 40 mm AA guns; 3 × 20 mm AA guns; 85 × Mk. 51 automatic rocket launchers

LSM(R)-197 was a United States Navy vessel laid down at Charleston Navy Yard, Charleston, South Carolina. The ship was commissioned on 8 December 1944.

== Design ==
LSM(R)-197 was one of twelve amphibious ships that evolved during World War II as battle experience identified new weapon requirements for the invasion of the Japanese home islands. These came out of modifications and conversions of LTC's, LCM's and LSM's.

In 1944 with the US Navy's mounting of a 5-inch/38 gun and rocket launchers on the LSM its mission to landing troop fire support out to 4,000 yards beyond the beach, they were to be used during the planned Invasion of Japan to be used for illumination, harassment and high trajectory fire to destroy reverse slope targets.

== Service history ==
During World War II the ship was assigned to the Fifth Fleet under Admiral Raymond A. Spruance. After reaching the front lines after being commissioned in San Diego, she came into action during the invasion of the Kerma Retto islands and served on the Okinawa Radar Picket Line. The class was mentioned in a Life magazine on 14 April 1945.
