= USS Windlass =

1945 Gypsy-class salvage lifting vessel

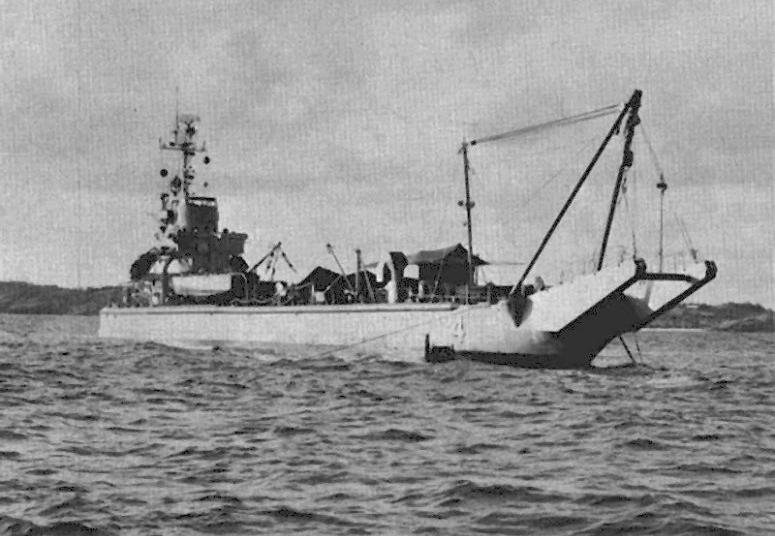
- USS Windlass ARS(D)-4 at anchor

History

United States
- Name: USS Windlass
- Ordered: 1945, as LSM-552
- Builder: Brown Shipbuilding, Houston, Texas
- Launched: 7 December 1945
- Commissioned: 9 April 1946
- Decommissioned: 23 November 1965
- Renamed: USS Windlass, 1 May 1945
- Reclassified: ARS(D)-4 (Salvage Lifting Vessel), 24 April 1945; YMLC-4 (Salvage Craft Medium), 16 October 1967
- Stricken: 1 August 1972
- Fate: Sold for scrapping, 6 March 1973

General characteristics
- Class & type: Gypsy-class salvage lifting vessel
- Displacement: 816 long tons (829 t)
- Length: 224 ft 9 in (68.50 m)
- Beam: 34 ft 10 in (10.62 m)
- Draft: 8 ft 4 in (2.54 m)
- Propulsion: 2 × Fairbanks-Morse (model 38D81/8X10, reversible with hydraulic clutch) diesel engines, direct drive with 1,440 bhp (1,074 kW) each at 720 rpm, twin screws
- Speed: 13 knots (24 km/h; 15 mph)
- Range: 4,900 nmi (9,100 km) at 12 kn (22 km/h; 14 mph) (928 tons displacement)
- Complement: 65 officers and enlisted
- Armament: None

USS Windlass (ARS(D)-4), a Gypsy-class salvage lifting vessel of the United States Navy, was originally conceived as LSM-552 and laid down on 27 August 1945 at Houston, Texas, by Brown Shipbuilding Corporation. Launched on 7 December 1945; and commissioned on 9 April 1946 in Houston at the Tennessee Coal and Iron Docks.

== 1945–1948 ==
Following further alterations and trials, Windlass shifted to Galveston, Texas, on 13 December, en route to her home port, Charleston, South Carolina. The salvage ship operated locally out of Charleston into May 1947 when she shifted to Norfolk, Virginia in May to conduct a towing exercise with her sister ship, Salvager (ARS(D)-3). The two ships departed the tidewater area for Bayonne, New Jersey, on 18 June, before they shifted to Narragansett Bay to salvage the tug One Wolf (YTB-179) — sunk in a collision in December 1946. Windlass and Salvager pooled their efforts to lift the sunken yard tug from 130 feet of water. One body still on board the sunken tug was recovered and taken ashore for burial.

Windlass and her sister ship returned to Bayonne, New Jersey on 28 July, but sailed for Mexico early the next month. Arriving at Veracruz on 15 August, Windlass assisted Salvager in raising two sunken Mexican barges in a two-week operation. Both salvage vessels then headed northward, bound for Bayonne. After touching at Key West, Florida, and Norfolk, they conducted exercises in the Chesapeake Bay before they reached Bayonne early in September.

On 10 September, Windlass, in company with Salvager, began searching for the sunken patrol craft YP-387. She located the wreck and began salvage operations while Salvager returned to Bayonne, apparently to get necessary equipment. Windlass apparently shifted briefly to Norfolk, for the same reason before both heavy-lifting salvage vessels returned to the site of the sunken YP off Hereford, New Jersey, on 1 October. Two days later, they placed demolition charges in the sunken "Yippie boat" and blew her up to prevent her from being a hazard to navigation. Windlass and her sister ship then returned to Bayonne.

Later that month, though, Windlass and Salvager again went to sea via Charleston, this time to 31°19'N/80°58'W, to search for YTB-274. Aided by a blimp, the two salvage vessels streamed sweep wires and eventually located the sunken wreck of the YTB on 21 October. Windlass and Salvager went into three-point moors over the sunken ship and commenced salvage operations. They recovered one body on 27 October before they blew up the wreck on 2 November to prevent its becoming a navigational menace. After exercises on their return voyage, the two salvage vessels made port at Bayonne on 3 November.

Windlass underwent a regular overhaul at the Charleston Naval Shipyard in April 1948, during which time she received additional radio and electronic gear and heavier anchors. The yard also reinforced the hull and added various engineering features. Upon completion of those alterations, Windlass returned to her home berth at Bayonne in June and remained there until 5 August, when she and Salvager sailed for Norfolk.

== U-1105 ==
Windlass and Salvager assisted in a four-point moor over U-1105 on 10 August 1948 and conducted salvage tests off Piney Point, Maryland on the former German U-boat until 25 August. Hurricane Carol interrupted operations as she swept through the area on 30 and 31 August, but both salvage vessels rode out the storm without damage, despite the force 5 winds. Windlass took the almost-submerged U-1105 undertow, supporting her partially with pontoons, and moored the ship on 28 September. Windlass and Salvager then performed various moors and salvage operations on the submarine's hulk off Piney Point until 18 November before returning to Bayonne. There, Windlass remained into 1949.

Again in company with Salvager, Windlass moved to Newport, Rhode Island, in early February 1949, for a period of upkeep alongside Vulcan (AR-5). Later that month, Windlass shifted to Newport and trained there before she returned to Bayonne on 23 March.

Windlass conducted mooring operations with USCG Tug 8188 and YTB-541 at Little Placentia Sound, NS Argentia, Newfoundland, in late May before returning to Bayonne on 1 June. She remained in port there until the 28th. When she got underway for Norfolk, again in company with Salvager. Windlass remained at Norfolk until 8 July, when she headed for Piney Point, the scene of her earlier experimental salvage evolutions on U-1105. From 11 July to 26 September, Windlass and Salvager assisted in the shifting of moorings of U-1105 while salvage tests were being conducted upon the ship. During that time, a heavy storm with winds up to 80 knots passed through the area, forcing Windlass to shift her mooring to deeper water where her anchors would hold.

For the remainder of 1949, Windlass operated in company with Salvager, at Norfolk, Bayonne, and in the Little Creek, Delaware area, before both ships underwent availability alongside Amphion (AR-13) at Charleston. From there, the longstanding partners returned to Bayonne to await their next assignment.

== USS Missouri ==
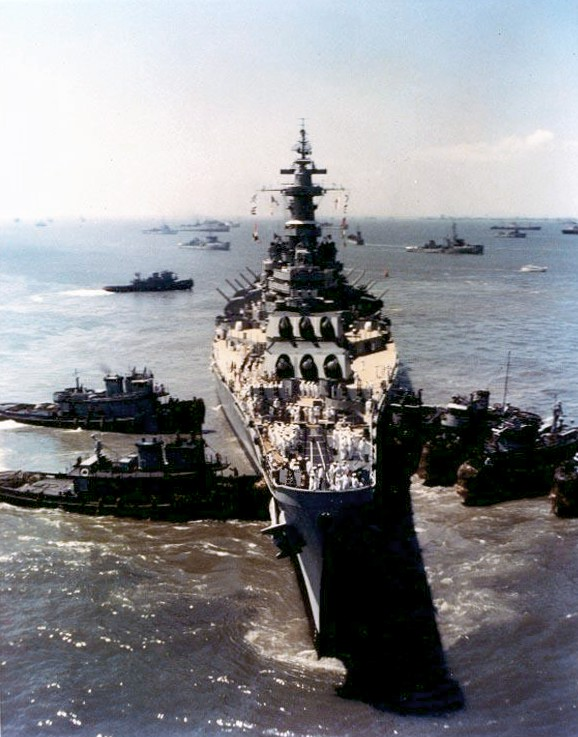
USS Missouri was accidentally grounded early on the morning of 17 January 1950.

In January 1950, Missouri (BB-63) ran aground off the Thimble Shoal Light Station in the Chesapeake Bay. Windlass and all other available salvage vessels were called to the scene to assist in one of the largest single salvage efforts since World War II. Various attempts to float the battleship off the shoal proved unsuccessful. That included running a division of destroyers by at high speed (an attempt to dislodge the ship by the wave force from the wakes of the ships) and the off-loading of fuel and ammunition. Still, the big battlewagon refused to budge.

Finally, however, a solution was worked out. With Windlass and Salvager in keystone positions, the various tugs, salvage ships, and submarine rescue vessels were utilized so as to maximize their pulling power. As a result of that combined effort, Missouri finally slid free but nearly ran down several of the salvage ships, including Windlass. For her part in that operation, Windlass received a commendation.

== 1950–1952 ==
For the remainder of 1950, Windlass performed various salvage tasks off the eastern seaboard and in the British West Indies. She investigated the wreck of SS Chile off Cape Henry, ascertaining whether or not the wreck was of sufficient danger to be a hazard to navigation; recovered practice mines; raised an LCVP off Wolf Trap Lighthouse; and planted moorings at Bermuda. Early in 1951, the ship continued planting moorings, this time in Lynnhaven Roads. Windlass' divers cleared a fouled tug propeller and removed several objects from Norfolk harbor.

After conducting a channel survey at Charleston, in April, Windlass returned to the Hampton Roads area, where she was present when the seaplane tender Valcour (AVP-55) caught fire on 14 May 1951. Windlass rendered fire fighting assistance, pumped necessary compartments dry, and maintained flooding boundaries while rigging temporary gasoline lines and removing the volatile aviation gas from the seaplane tender's storage tanks. Windlass' divers subsequently inspected that ship for underwater damage, and Windlass herself received a commendation for her part in averting a near disaster.

Other operations performed by Windlass during 1951 included removing channel obstructions, raising an LCM and a small boat, refloating the grounded PC-572 off Cedar Point, removing the obstruction which had fouled a propeller of Gearing (DD-710), righting a target sled, conducting diving school, and mooring the hulk of the former YC-313 in the Potomac River. Windlass arrived at the Charleston Naval Shipyard on 12 November 1951 and remained there until 8 January 1952, undergoing an overhaul. During that time, the ship's hull was again stiffened and her engines overhauled.

After leaving the shipyard, Windlass conducted diving operations off Cape Charles, Virginia before she proceeded to Saint Thomas, U.S. Virgin Islands, to assist in rigging YC-1060 for technical tests. On 14 February 1952, Windlass, towing YC-1010, got underway for Norfolk. Two days later, while the salvage ship and her charge were en route to their destination, an explosion occurred in Windlass port engine crankcase, injuring one man and starting a fire. After the crew extinguished the blaze with no further damage, Windlass proceeded the remainder of the way to Norfolk on one engine. After arrival, both of Windlass engines were inspected carefully and again overhauled.

In March, April, and May 1952, Windlass operated at Roosevelt Roads, Puerto Rico, rigging test targets for demolition experiments. In addition, she set off the charges and retrieved underwater models before returning to Norfolk, again towing YC-1010. The ship continued her association with ordnance-related projects that summer, surveying a mooring site; and mooring underwater explosive barges and Ulua (ex-SS-428) in the Chesapeake Bay at the mouth of the Patuxent River for the Naval Ordnance Laboratory (NOL), Solomons, Maryland. During July and August, the ship set off some of the charges involved in NOL's testing program.

Windlass then sailed to Cape Fear, North Carolina, later that summer and surveyed the area around the sunken YSD-68. A hurricane caused a brief change in plans, however, as the salvage ship shifted briefly to Charleston to avoid it. On 29 September, Windlass began dragging the bottom with a "hawk" anchor and, on 6 October, located the self-propelled seaplane wrecking derrick on the bottom, upside down. Despite a period of "unusually adverse weather" and what Windlass' command history termed "the usual salvage job setbacks," Windlass raised YSD-68 early in November. The bad weather during that period had meant frequent interruptions to put into the nearest port, Southport, North Carolina.

== 1953–1955 ==
Returning to the Norfolk area after salvaging YSD-68, Windlass conducted local salvage and diving operations for the remainder of 1952. The salvage vessel remained at Norfolk into February 1953, when she commenced a search for a downed Navy plane on the 5th of the month. Crash boats from NAS, Atlantic City, New Jersey, assisted Windlass in the dragging operations begun that same day and located the plane, minus its tail section, soon thereafter. Windlass raised the plane, brought it on board between the two "horns" forward, and returned to Norfolk where the aircraft was removed by a dockside crane. That salvage effort set a precedent for the new and useful application of ships like Windlass and her sisters.

After salvaging a target raft at Newport News, Virginia, Windlass pulled the grounded yacht Boudoin off the south shore of the Potomac River on 18 February before resuming local operations that carried into the summer of 1953. Windlass emerged from her overhaul in early October and proceeded thence to St. Thomas and Roosevelt Roads, where the ship assisted in underwater explosive experiments in November.

Shifting back to Norfolk, Windlass served as standby and duty salvage vessel there into the spring of 1954, recovering several practice mines and anchors during that time. She participated in Project "Caesar" out of Shelburne harbor, Nova Scotia, trenching and blasting in the ocean floor off the Nova Scotia coast. At one point during the mission, Windlass took shelter in Shelburne harbor from Hurricane Edna.

In September, Windlass returned to Norfolk where she resumed her local operations. Two months later, on 8 November 1954, Windlass headed to a point off Cape Henry where she commenced salvage operations trying to raise two sunken planes. One broke up while being raised and could not be recovered. On 13 November, Windlass recovered the body of one aviator that had been lost in one of the downed planes.

Windlass operated locally out of Norfolk into 1955. The following summer, she again participated in Project "Caesar" evolutions—in mid-June off Shelburne; in late July off Cape May, New Jersey; and in September off Cape Hatteras, North Carolina. After underway training out of Newport and rest and recreation at New York, New York, Windlass attempted the salvage of the sunken yacht Turbatross off Tangier Island in the Chesapeake Bay. Although the Navy salvage effort was initially successful in raising the sunken vessel, Turbatross' hull warped badly and sank again when a sling strap parted.

== USS Basilone ==
Windlass received a summons to assist in refloating the grounded destroyer Basilone (DDE-824) off Fort Story. Rough weather hampered the operations which were begun on 5 January 1956, and Seneca (ATF-91) also ran aground during the attempt to pull Basilone free. Wires snapped on board Hoist (ARS-40), and Windlass dragged dangerously near the destroyer and the beach but managed to cut loose and steer clear. With ice on her decks and rigging, Windlass returned to Norfolk the next day.

When the weather moderated, Windlass and Salvager returned to the scene of the dual grounding. The former pulled off stranded Seneca, and the latter pulled Basilone free. Windlass remained in the vicinity to pick up beach gear anchors and wires strewn over the bottom, recovering a total of 14 anchors.

== 1956–1964 ==
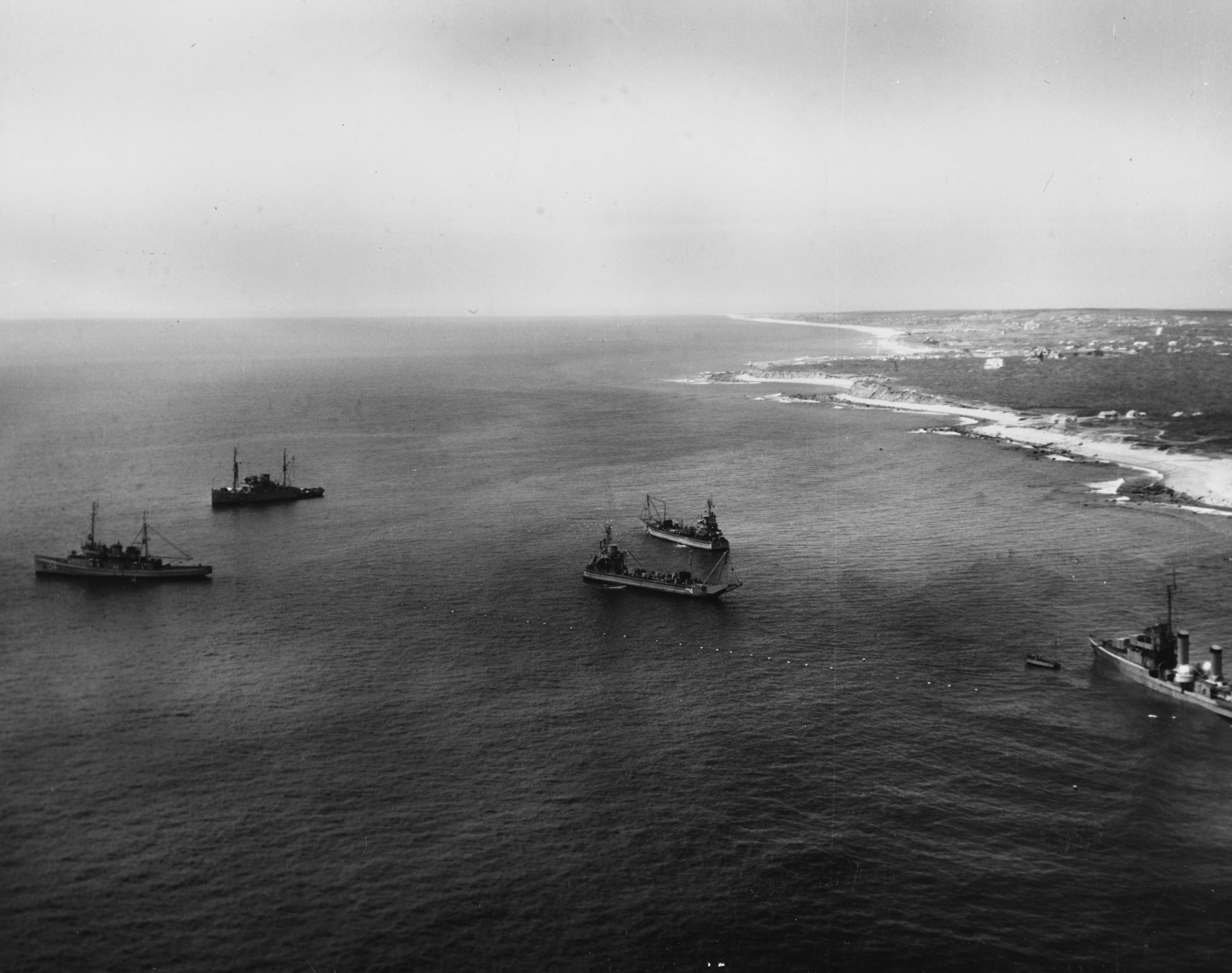
USS Baldwin, at right, during operations to refloat her at Montauk Point on 28 April 1961. Among the ships engaged in the salvage effort are USS Hoist (ARS-40), USS Salvager (ARS(D)-3), USS Windlass (ARS(D)-4) and a fleet tug (ATF).

For the next 10 years, Windlass conducted a regular schedule of operations out of Norfolk or Charleston, performing salvage and diving jobs of many different types. In mid-July 1956, the ship again participated in Project "Caesar"; she pulled a target sled off a beach in the Chesapeake Bay in November, and finished the year by pulling Seagull (MSF-55) off the beach east of Little Creek. In the spring of 1957, Windlass operated for three weeks at Chincoteague, Virginia, in a Jupiter missile nose cone recovery. That summer, the ship recovered most of the wreckage from two AJ Savage bombers that had collided late in June off Ocean View, Virginia. She later conducted exercises with Salvager before returning to Norfolk for diver qualifications; she was preparing to enjoy Christmas liberty when an emergency work request to raise the sunken YSD-56 came through. On 16 December 1957, the ship put to sea and spent five days engaged in the task, only to admit defeat when the badly wrecked YSD appeared so badly torn and ruptured that refloatation was impossible, and the YSD sank again on 23 December. At 2315 that evening, Commander, Service Force, Atlantic Fleet, sent a dispatch releasing Windlass from recovery operations so that all hands could enjoy the Christmas holidays.

Windlass subsequently recovered the wrecks of airplanes, salvaged small landing craft that had sunk during amphibious maneuvers, and participated in other classified projects in locales that ranged from Argentia, Newfoundland, to the Chesapeake Bay; from Guantanamo Bay to Assateague Island; and from San Salvador to Nova Scotia. In addition, the ship cleared navigational channels and, again operating in company with Salvager, raised the sunken YTB-495 in mid-June 1960. She retrieved the downed airship KE-5 in mid-July of that year and recovered two destroyer anchors slipped during Hurricane Donna in September 1960. The year 1961 was one which held both honor and tragedy for the ship. In May 1961, she received the Ney Award for having the best general mess in ships of her class. Unfortunately in May 1961, one man was killed and one seriously injured during the salvage of Baldwin (DD-624) which had run aground under tow off Montauk Point.

== 1965–1973 ==
In July 1965, the ship's home port was changed from Little Creek, to Davisville, R.I. No sooner had she shifted her base northward when she was called to the Mississippi River on salvage alert due to the passage of Hurricane Betsy. She departed Davisville on 11 September and arrived at New Orleans, Louisiana on 20 September to commence salvage operations on the USNS Kellar (T-AGS-25), sunk in the Mississippi. She moored over Kellar on the 23rd; commenced salvage rigging; and ultimately righted the Military Sea Transportation Service ship on 7 October.

After salvage operations on Kellar were completed on 11 November, Windlass began preparations for decommissioning. On 23 November 1965, Windlass was decommissioned at New Orleans and converted to a non-self-propelled craft over the ensuing months. Re-classified as a medium salvage craft on 16 October 1967 and given the hull number YMLC-4, Windlass was placed in service with Advanced Bases, Pacific area, but was used minimally in ensuing years. Since replacement craft attained superior lift capability, the need for Windlass' services diminished; she was accordingly struck from the Naval Vessel Register on 1 August 1972 and sold on 6 March 1973 to the Union Minerals & Alloys Corporation, New York City, where she was cut up for scrap.

== Awards ==
USS Windlass has received:

World War II Victory Medal
National Defense Service Medal
Armed Forces Expeditionary Medal (Cuba)
