= Portugal Colonial =

Portuguese magazine

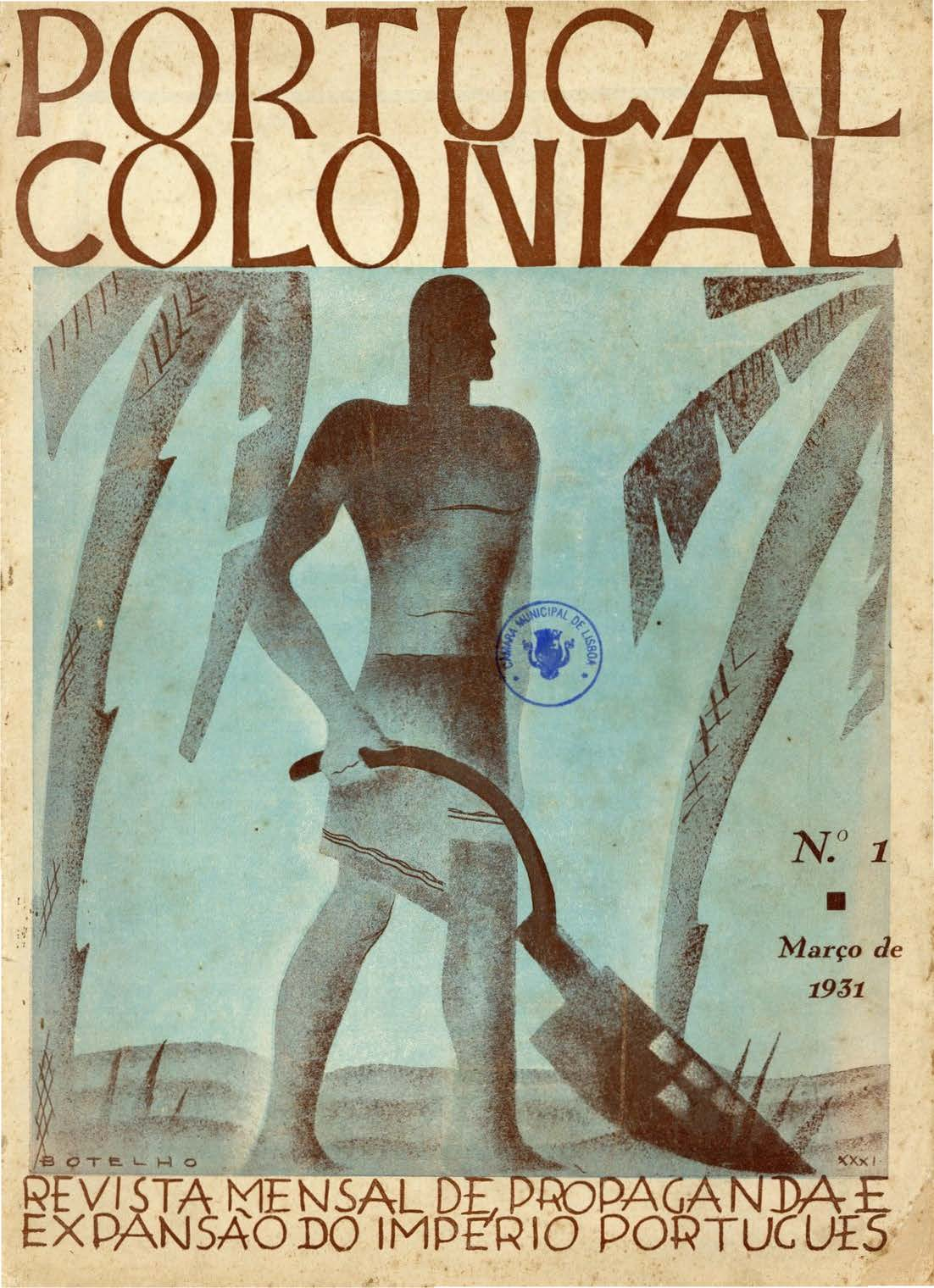
- Portugal Colonial No. 1, March 1931, HD cover
- Staff writers: Henrique Galvão
- Format: 31 cm
- Founded: 1931
- First issue: March 1931
- Final issue: February 1937
- Country: Portugal, Portuguese Empire
- Language: Portuguese; French (partial)

Portugal Colonial : revista de expansão e propaganda colonial (Portuguese for Colonial Portugal: Review on Colonial Expansion and Propaganda) was a magazine related to events in the colonies of the Portuguese Empire outside the Portuguese Main (which also included the Azores and Madeira). Publication began in March 1931 and finished in February 1937, it made 72 issues. Its content with the name of the title related to the events in the Portuguese colonies (even with its large notorious attention on the Angolan colony) "a sharing of the reflections on many different problems related to the administration and the development of the colonies, denounced problemas, representing interests of the corporative press and defend solutions". In sum, the essence of a colonial mission was stopped, with the participation of a gallery of individuals (governor's members, senior cadres of the colonial administration, troops, etc.,), in between, writers who published the review included Henrique Galvão who was the first director, Agostinho de Campos, Francisco Alves de Azevedo, Henrique de Paiva Couceiro, Alexandre Lopes Galvão, A. Leite de Magalhães, Armindo Monteiro, Joaquim Teixeira de Nóbrega, Henrique Parreira, Carlos de Brito Queiroga, Braz Temudo, Joaquim Paço d'Arcos, Joaquim Bensaude, Teófilo Duarte (who was colonial governor of Cape Verde), Maria Archer, Carlos Botelho and Diniz Fragoso.

== See also ==
- List of magazines in Portugal
