= USS Salvager =

1945 Gypsy-class salvage lifting vessel

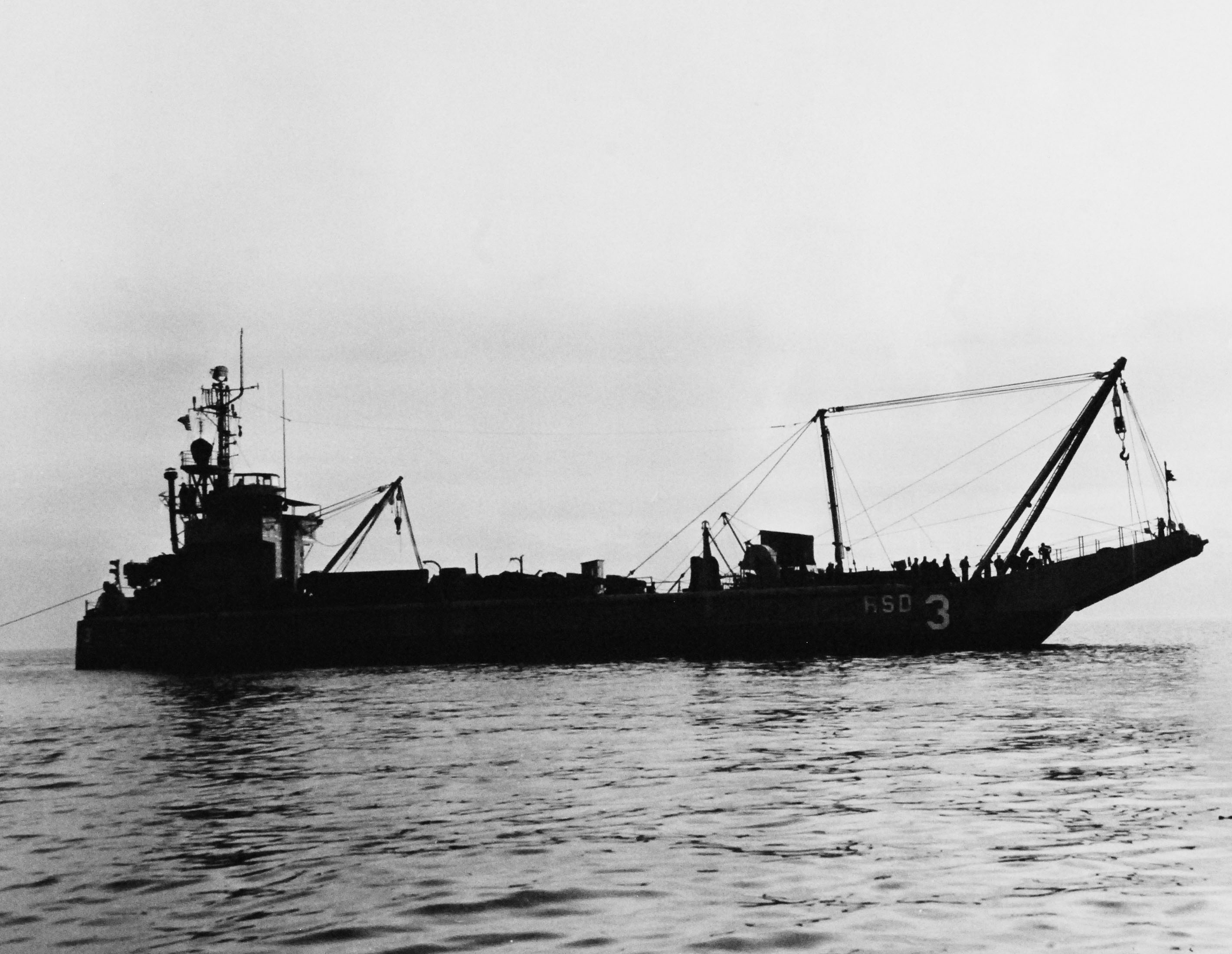
- USS Salvager

History

United States
- Name: USS Salvager
- Ordered: 1945, as LSM-551
- Builder: Brown Shipbuilding, Houston, Texas
- Laid down: 27 August 1945
- Launched: 7 December 1945
- Commissioned: 22 March 1946
- Decommissioned: 23 November 1965
- Renamed: USS Salvager, 1 May 1945
- Reclassified: ARS(D)-3 (Salvage Lifting Vessel), 24 April 1945; YMLC-3 (Salvage Craft Medium), 16 October 1967
- Stricken: 1 August 1972
- Fate: Unknown, presumed scrapped

General characteristics
- Class & type: Gypsy-class salvage lifting vessel
- Displacement: 816 long tons (829 t)
- Length: 224 ft 9 in (68.50 m)
- Beam: 34 ft 10 in (10.62 m)
- Draft: 8 ft 4 in (2.54 m)
- Propulsion: 2 × Fairbanks-Morse (model 38D81/8X10, reversible with hydraulic clutch) diesel engines, direct drive with 1,440 bhp (1,074 kW) each at 720 rpm, twin screws
- Speed: 13 knots (24 km/h; 15 mph)
- Range: 4,900 nmi (9,100 km) at 12 kn (22 km/h; 14 mph) (928 tons displacement)
- Complement: 65 officers and enlisted
- Armament: None

USS Salvager (ARS(D)-3), a Gypsy-class salvage lifting vessel of the United States Navy, was originally conceived as LSM-551, was reclassified ARS(D)-3 on 24 April 1945; named Salvager on 1 May 1945; laid down on 27 August 1945 by the Brown Shipbuilding Corporation, Houston, Texas; launched on 7 December 1945; and commissioned on 22 March 1946.

== 1945-1949 ==
Designed for salvage and rescue work, Salvager completed shakedown off Cuba and put into Charleston, SC, on 29 November. She remained there until mid-May 1947, then got underway for Norfolk, VA. By the end of the month, she had commenced the varied activities which, although conducted primarily along the eastern and southern coasts of the United States and among the islands of the Caribbean, would range from Newfoundland to the coasts of Central America.

In May, the salvage lifting ship inspected buoys in Chesapeake Bay. In June, she moved up the east coast to Narragansett Bay; operated with Windlass (ARS(D)-4) to lift a sunken tug from 130 feet of water and move it closer to the beach; then sailed for Bayonne, NJ, for upkeep and replenishment of stores and salvage matériel.

Continuing operations with Windlass, she sailed south on 6 August; spent two weeks salvaging two Mexican barges off Veracruz; and returned to Norfolk. At the end of September, the two ARS(D)'s moved up to Hereford Inlet, NJ, to raise YP-387; and, in mid-October, proceeded south to the Georgia coast to locate and demolish another sunken tug.

Before the end of the year, Salvager received an A-frame and winch on her bow which facilitated recovery of submerged objects and enabled her to lift 78 tons over the bow.

With the new year, 1948, Salvager continued her work of removing dangers to navigation; and, in August, she began salvage tests on the German submarine U-1105 off Piney Point, MD. She tested techniques of salvage and towing on the U-boat into November, then stripped the test boat of all experimental equipment; sank her temporarily off Point No Point Light; and planted buoys to mark the spot. Then, with the addition of two sets of beach gear, she resumed normal salvage work, again operating primarily with Windlass.

Following duty off the southern New England and mid-Atlantic coasts into the spring of 1949, she moved north to Newfoundland in May. In June, she returned to the Chesapeake Bay to raise U-1105 and tow her to Piney Point, MD, where, in September, the U-boat was sunk in demolition tests.

== 1950-1959 ==
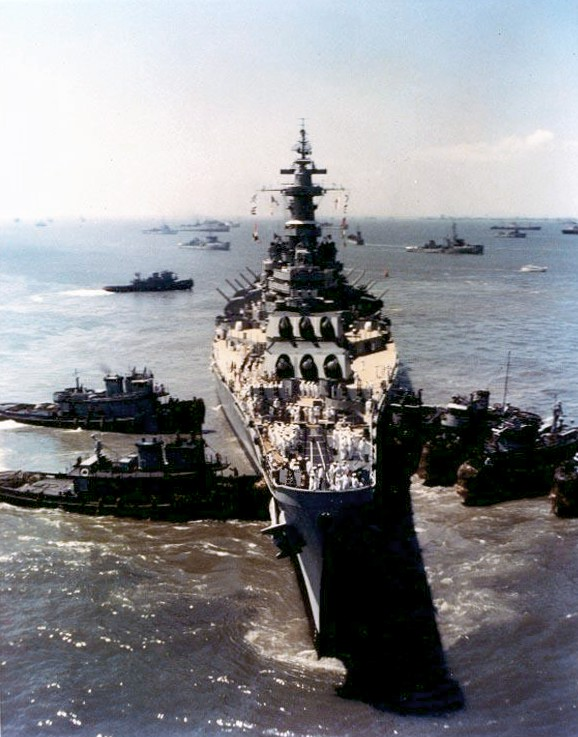
USS Missouri was accidentally grounded early on the morning of 17 January 1950.

During the fall, Salvager added minesweeping operations to her duties. Overhaul rounded out the year; and, in January 1950, she resumed operations by assistonly a portion of her mission; mine recovery, diver training, and local salvage operations including recovery of airplanes for both the US Navy and the US Air Force were also continued.

1953 brought, for a salvage vessel, relative inactivity. Deployed only twice, to the waters off Florida and to the Caribbean, she remained in the Norfolk area for most of the year. In 1954, however, she resumed a more hectic schedule. In February, she conducted underwater demolition tests in the U.S. Virgin Islands. During the spring, she operated off the mid-Atlantic seaboard and in the Bermuda area. In July, she destroyed and cleared the wreckage of YFN-6 from Delaware Bay; and, in August, she moved north to Nantucket, MA to conduct a survey of current and tide conditions and their effects upon the bottom. Three months later, she moved into the British West Indies to clear obstructions near Eleuthera Island; and, in December, she returned to Norfolk.

Through the remainder of the 1950s, Salvager continued her varied activities. Major operations included the raising of downed aircraft and sunken district and landing craft; unbeaching of LST's; refloating a destroyer, Basilone (DD-824); destruction of the long-sunken hulk of the battleship Texas; mooring and logistic support for experimental and scientific work; excavation of trenches and laying of cables; location and recovery of a misfired space capsule; and special operations requested by the Bureau of Ships.

== 1960-1972 ==
Salvager began the 1960s in Chesapeake Bay where she completed the demolition of the wreck of the Texas, begun in 1958. Special projects for the Bureau of Ships and deep sea mooring operations followed; and, in June 1960, she resumed salvage operations on sunken vessels and aircraft. In July, she added the recovery of the wreckage of a blimp to her record, then assumed salvage standby duty which rounded out the year.

The new year, 1961, started with training operations. But, with the end of winter, she resumed a full schedule of salvage, recovery, and special operations which continued for the next four and a half years. Major salvage operations saw her off the New Jersey coast to assist in refloating the grounded destroyers, Baldwin (DD-624) in 1961 and Monssen (DD-798) in 1962; off Morehead City, NC, to clear the wreckage of the oiler, USNS Potomac (T-AO-150), and off Newfoundland to recover heavy, fleet-type moorings and mines in 1963; and in Louisiana waters, to assist in clearance operations following Hurricane Betsy in 1965.

In addition to special operations for the Bureau of Ships during the same period, Salvager also supported Naval Oceanographic Office projects. In November 1963, she towed NOMAD (Naval Oceanographic Meteorological Automatic Device) 150 miles out to sea and moored it in 1,600 fathoms. Following the initial mooring, she returned several times to bring NOMAD in for checking and to change its position.

Following operations during September and October 1965, in Louisiana after "Betsy," Salvager prepared for inactivation. Decommissioned on 23 November, she remained in reserve for less than two years. During 1966, she was converted to a non-self-propelled vessel. On 16 October 1967, she was redesignated YMLC-3 (Salvage Craft, Medium); and, in December, she was placed in service and assigned to Advanced Bases, Pacific Area. Then taken to the Philippines, she operated out of Subic Bay until she was ordered back to the east coast of the United States for inactivation in July 1971. She was struck from the Naval Vessel Register on 1 August 1972.

== Awards ==
USS Salvager has received:

| World War II Victory Medal |
| National Defense Service Medal |
