= Maria Archer =

Portuguese writer and activist (1899–1982)

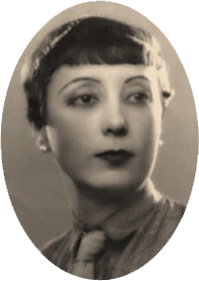
- Born: Maria Emilia Archer Eyrolles Baltasar Moreira; 4 January 1899; Lisbon, Portugal
- Died: 23 January 1982 (aged 83); Lisbon, Portugal
- Occupations: Writer, activist, playwright
- Known for: Sertanejos (book)
- Spouse: Alberto Teixeira Passos
- Awards: Maria Amália Vaz de Carvalho Prize - Children's Literature (1938)

Maria Emilia Archer Eyrolles Baltasar Moreira, known to her readers as Maria Archer (4 January 1899 – 23 January 1982), was a writer and activist from Lisbon, Portugal.

== Biography ==
=== Early life ===
Born in Lisbon, Archer lived most of her life outside of Portugal. As a result of her parents' frequent journeys with their children, she did not finish elementary school until she was much older than normal students making her essentially a self-taught writer. Reportedly, she started creating verse as a young child although no evidence of those poems remains.

In 1910, her parents moved the family to Mozambique, Africa. She was the first-born of six children. The family returned to Portugal in 1914, but two years later they were back in Africa, this time in Guinea-Bissau.

In 1921, while her father was on a trip to Portugal, Maria Archer married a Portuguese man, Alberto Teixeira Passos and the young couple took up residence on the island of Ibo in Mozambique. Five years later, after the fall of the democratic regime there and the subsequent crisis, her husband lost his job at a bank and the two moved to Faro, Portugal. In 1931, the marriage ended and they divorced.

=== Writings ===
As a single woman, she returned to Africa to live with her parents in Luanda, Angola, where she began her literary career in earnest. She started attending writing conferences and her first published work appeared in magazines.

She called her first book, Três Mulheres (Three Women), a soap opera, which was published in the same volume that contained a police adventure story by António Pinto Quartin, A Lenda e o Ação do Estranho Caso de Pauling.

She returned to Lisbon, where she began a period of intense writing activity, producing works describing her experience in Africa. In 1945, she also became an activist, joining the group called Movement of Democratic Unity (MUD), consisting of those opposed to the repressive regime of President Salazar in Portugal.

After she gained recognition as an activist, she began having problems with the political police. Her works were censored and her novel Casa Sem Pão (1947) was seized. According to the writer Dina Botelho,

"She closely followed the trial of the challenger of the Salazar dictatorship, Captain Henrique Carlos Galvão at the Military Court of Santa Clara. Having proposed to write a book about it, she saw her home invaded by the International Police and State Defense (PIDE) shortly after the end of the trial in 1953. She did eventually publish it in 1959, in Brazil, under the title The Last Days of Portuguese Fascism".

Unable to make money from her writings in Portugal, she left for Brazil, on 5 July 1955 and arrived ten days later.

=== Exiled ===
While in Brazil, she "lived poor and sick," but she still wrote for some newspapers there, collaborating with O Estado de S. Paulo, Semana Portuguesa and Portugal Democrático and Revista Municipal de Lisboa (1939–1973). Her themes included both African-subjects as well as works opposing the Portuguese dictatorship. She also collaborated with Brazilian magazines such as, Portugal Colonial (full title: Colonial Portugal: Review on Colonial Expansion and Propaganda) (1931–1937) as well as the Portuguese-Brazilian magazine Atlântico: revista luso-brasileira.

During her years in self-imposed exile, she is said to have completed five books and published them in Brazil, but records of only four exist.

=== Later years ===
By the end of her writing career, Archer had produced more than 30 works ranging over many different genres including a children's adventure novel, novels for adults and plays. Some of her work was republished in multiple editions.

Finally, in 1979, she returned to Lisbon for the last time, moving into a long-term residential care facility called Manor of Santa Maria de Marvila on 26 April. There she spent the last three years of life. She died in 1982 at 83 years of age.

== Tributes ==
Writer João Gaspar Simões, in 1930 wrote of her, "I don't even know another (Portuguese writer) who, with the audacity of themes and ideas, combines such an energetic and personal expression. Her style breathes strength and solidity."

== Selected works ==
Archer's work resulted in "impressive output, which included novels, short fiction, essays and plays."

- Três Mulheres (Three Women) (com Pinto Quartim Graça) - Luanda, Mondego, 1935
- África Selvagem (Wild Africa) - Lisboa, Guimarães & lda, 1935
- Sertanejos - Lisboa, Editorial Cosmos, 1936
- Singularidades de Um País Distante (Singularities of a Distant Country) - Lisboa, Editorial Cosmos, 1936
- Ninho de Bárbaros (Barbarian's Nest) - Lisboa, Editorial Cosmos, 1936
- Angola Filme (Angola Movie) - Lisboa, Editorial Cosmos,1937
- Ida e Volta duma Caixa de Cigarros (Round Trip from a Cigarette Box) - Lisboa, Editorial O Século, 1938
- Viagem à Roda de África (Journey to the Wheel of Africa) - romance de aventuras infantis, Lisboa, Editorial O Século, 1938
- Colónias Piscatórias em Angola (Fishing Colonies in Angola) - Lisboa, Cosmos, 1938
- Caleidoscópio Africano (African Kaleidoscope) - Lisboa, Edições Cosmos, 1938
- Há dois Ladrões sem Cadastro (There are Two Thieves without Registration) - Lisboa, Editora Argo, 1940
- Roteiro do Mundo Português (Portuguese World Tour) - Lisboa, Edições Cosmos, Lisboa, 1940
- Fauno Sovina - Lisboa, Livraria Portugália, 1941
- Memórias da Linha de Cascais (Memories of the Cascais Line) - com Branca de Gonta Colaço, Lisboa, parceria António Maria Pereira, 1943
- Os Parques Infantis, (The Children's Parks) Lisboa - Associação Nacional dos Parques Infantis, 1943
- Ela É Apenas Mulher (She's Just a Woman) - com António Maria Pereira, Lisboa, 1944
- Aristocratas (Aristocrats) - Lisboa, Editorial Aviz, 1945
- Eu e Elas, Apontamentos de Romancista (Me and They, Novelist Notes) - Lisboa, Editorial Aviz, 1945
- A Morte Veio de Madrugada (Death Came at Dawn) - Coimbra, Coimbra Editora Lda, 1946
- Casa Sem Pão - Lisboa, Empresa Contemporânea de Edições, 1947
- Há-de Haver uma Lei (There Will Be a Law) - Lisboa, Edição da Autora, 1949
- O Mal Não Está em Nós (Evil Is Not in Us) - Porto, Livraria Simões Lopes, 1950
- Filosofia duma Mulher Moderna (Philosophy of a Modern Woman), Porto, Livraria Simões Lopes, 1950
- Bato às Portas da Vida - Lisboa, Edições SIT, 1951
- Nada lhe Será Perdoado (Nothing Will Be Forgiven) - Lisboa, Edições SIT, 1953
- A Primeira Vítima do Diabo (The Devil's First Victim) - Lisboa, Edições SIT, 1954
- Terras onde se fala Português (Lands where Portuguese is spoken) - Rio de Janeiro, Ed. Casa do Estudante do Brasil, 1957
- Os Últimos Dias do Fascismo Português (The Last Days of Portuguese Fascism) - S. Paulo, Editora Liberdade e Cultura, 1959
- África Sem Luz (Africa Without Light) - São Paulo, Clube do Livro, 1962
- Brasil, Fronteira da África (Brazil, Frontier of Africa) - São Paulo, Felman-Rêgo, 1963
- Herança Lusíada - Lisboa, Edições Sousa e Costa, s.d.

=== Plays ===
- Alfacinha - comedy in one act for a single character, published in Sol, 1949
- Isto que Chamam Amor (This They Call Love) - drama in one act for a single character.
- Numa Casa Abandonada (In an Abandoned House) - drama in one act for a single character.
- O Poder do Dinheiro (The Power of Money) - comedy in three acts
- O Leilão (The Auction) - drama in three acts
