= USS Baldwin =

Gleaves-class destroyer

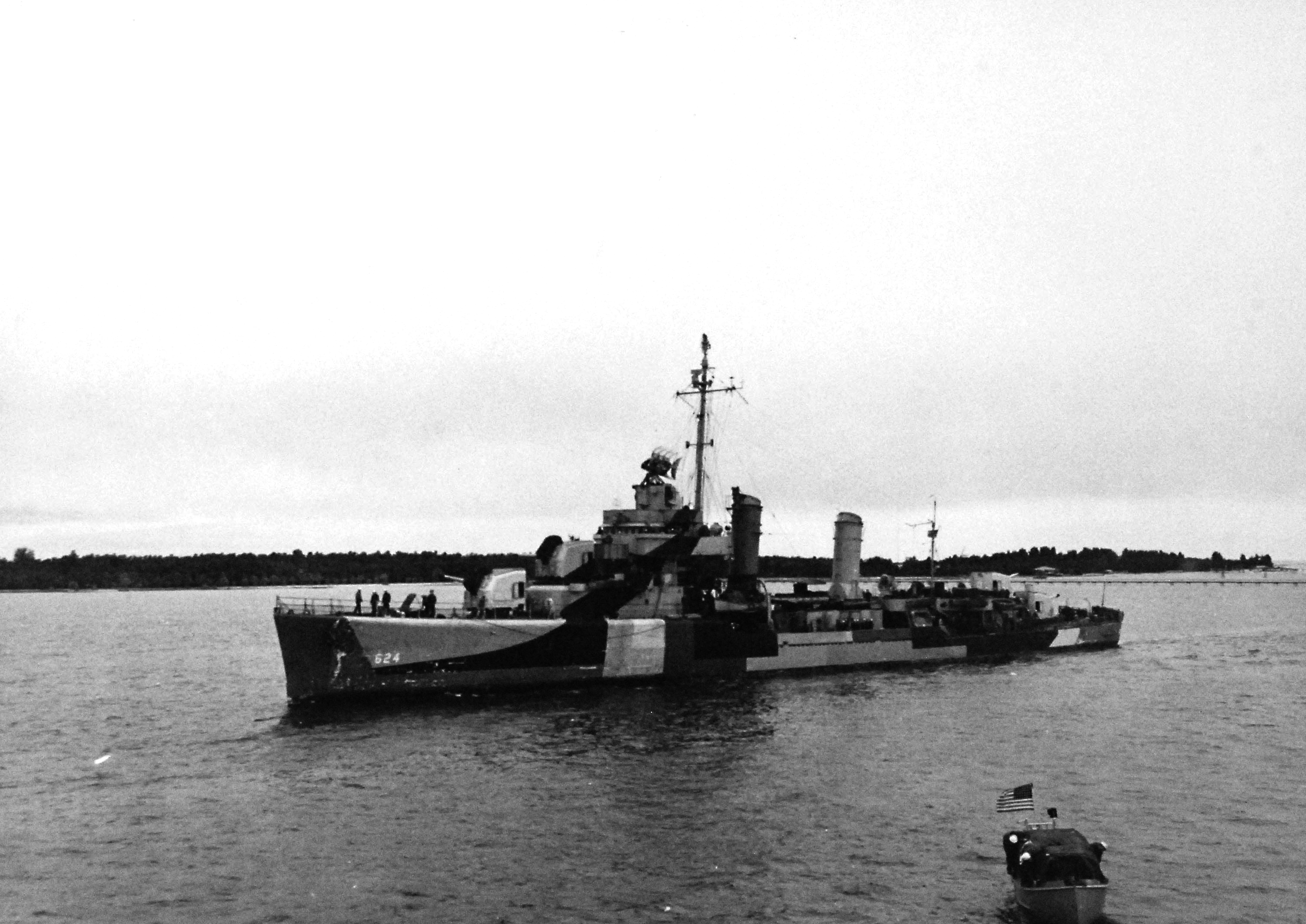
- USS Baldwin in the Suez Canal, Egypt, on 9 February 1945

History

United States
- Name: Baldwin
- Namesake: Charles H. Baldwin
- Builder: Seattle-Tacoma Shipbuilding Corporation
- Laid down: 19 July 1941
- Launched: 14 June 1942
- Commissioned: 30 April 1943
- Decommissioned: 20 June 1946
- Stricken: 1 June 1961
- Fate: Scuttled, 5 June 1961

General characteristics
- Class & type: Gleaves-class destroyer
- Displacement: 1,630 tons
- Length: 348 ft 4 in (106.17 m)
- Beam: 36 ft 0 in (10.97 m)
- Draft: 17 ft 6 in (5.33 m)
- Propulsion: 50,000 shp (37,000 kW); 4 boilers; 2 propellers
- Speed: 35 knots (65 km/h)
- Range: 6,500 nautical miles (12,000 km; 7,500 mi) at 12 kn (22 km/h; 14 mph)
- Complement: 16 officers, 260 enlisted
- Armament: 4 × 5 in (127 mm)/38 caliber dual purpose guns; 6 × 0.50 in (12.7 mm) machine guns, 2 × twin Bofors 40 mm guns, 7 × Oerlikon 20 mm cannons, 5 × 21 in (533 mm) torpedo tubes (5 Mark 15 torpedoes), 6 × depth charge projectors, 2 × depth charge tracks

USS Baldwin (DD-624), was a United States Navy Gleaves-class destroyer, in service from 1943 to 1946. She was the only ship of the U.S. Navy to be named for Charles H. Baldwin, an 1864 Medal of Honor recipient.

Baldwin was laid down on 19 July 1941 by Seattle-Tacoma Shipbuilding Co., Seattle, Washington and launched on 14 June 1942, sponsored by Mrs. Ida E. Crawford, daughter of Acting Master's Mate Baldwin. The ship was commissioned on 30 April 1943 and reported to the United States Atlantic Fleet.

== Service history ==
=== 1943 ===
After shakedown training along the West Coast, the destroyer put to sea from San Francisco, California, on 1 July, bound for the East Coast. The flagship of Destroyer Division 36 (DesDiv 36), Baldwin led her division into Norfolk, Virginia, on 19 July and operated along the east coast until getting underway from New York on 13 August in the screen of a convoy bound for Casablanca, Morocco. Similar arrangements occupied her time until late January 1944, when she resumed duty along the Atlantic seaboard of the United States.

=== 1944 ===
Some three months later, on 17 April 1944, Baldwin headed for Europe in the screen for Arkansas, Nevada, and Tuscaloosa. The destroyer arrived at Plymouth, England, on 28 April and began a routine that combined patrols in British waters with preparations for the invasion of Normandy.

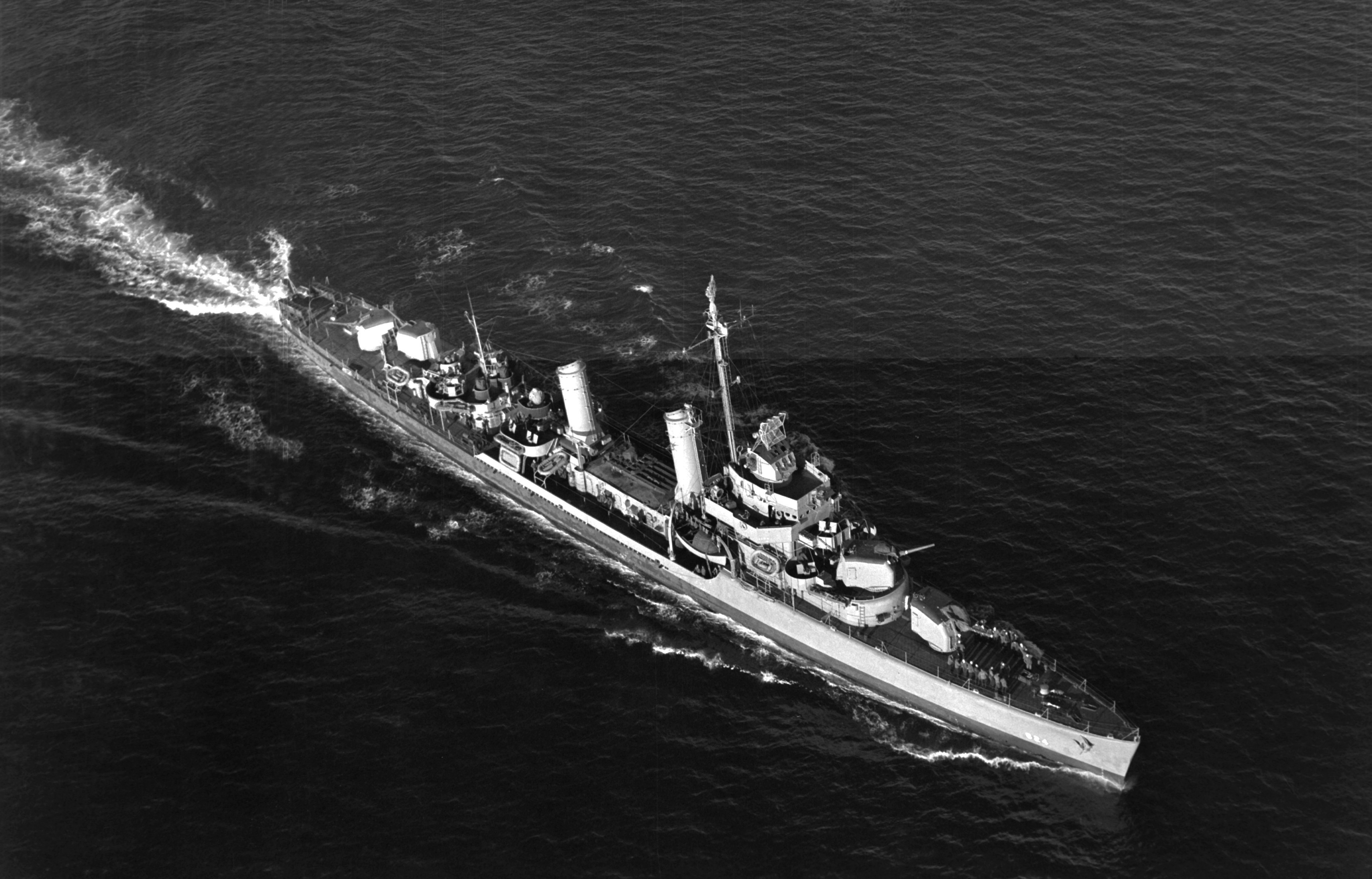
USS Baldwin in 1944

On 5 June, she departed the Isle of Portland in company with other units of the Western Naval Task Force. As a unit of the gunfire support group during the assault, Baldwin assisted the troops ashore with naval gunfire. In return, she suffered two hits from a light-caliber shore battery on D-Day, but sustained only slight damage. On 9 June, Baldwin joined Frankford in repulsing an attack by German E-boats and received credit for destroying one of them. She operated off the coast of France until 15 July when she returned to England.

Three days later, the destroyer departed Plymouth in the screen of a 50-ship convoy bound for North Africa and arrived in Bizerte, Tunisia, on 28 July. She operated in the western Mediterranean mostly between Oran, Algeria, and Naples, Italy before arriving off Saint-Tropez on 15 August, D-Day for the invasion of southern France. Baldwin served there as an element of the Antisubmarine and Convoy Control Group, Task Group 80.6 (TG 80.6) which screened follow up convoys between Oran and southern France. On 23 September, she concluded her part in that operation and departed Oran in company with her division mates bound for the United States.

=== 1945 ===
Upon her arrival at New York on 3 October, the destroyer resumed operations in American coastal waters. On 21 January 1945, Baldwin put to sea from Norfolk to rendezvous with the cruiser Quincy which carried President Franklin D. Roosevelt on the first leg of the trip to the "Big Three" conference at Yalta. She returned to New York on 27 February and began four months of operations in American waters. During that time, Baldwin escorted Bon Homme Richard to the Panama Canal Zone and operated off the east coast in the antisubmarine screens of the aircraft carriers Boxer and Card.

On 24 June, the destroyer sailed from New York on her way to the Pacific. Steaming in company with Nelson, she visited Guantánamo Bay in Cuba; Balboa in the Canal Zone and San Diego before arriving at Pearl Harbor on 12 August. A month later, the warship joined Task Force 55 (TF 55) at Okinawa to prepare for the occupation of Sasebo, Japan, and participated in that operation between 20 September and 2 October. By 7 October, Baldwin was at Pusan, Korea, supporting forces sweeping mines along the Chinese and Korean coasts, a task at which she labored for the remainder of 1945.

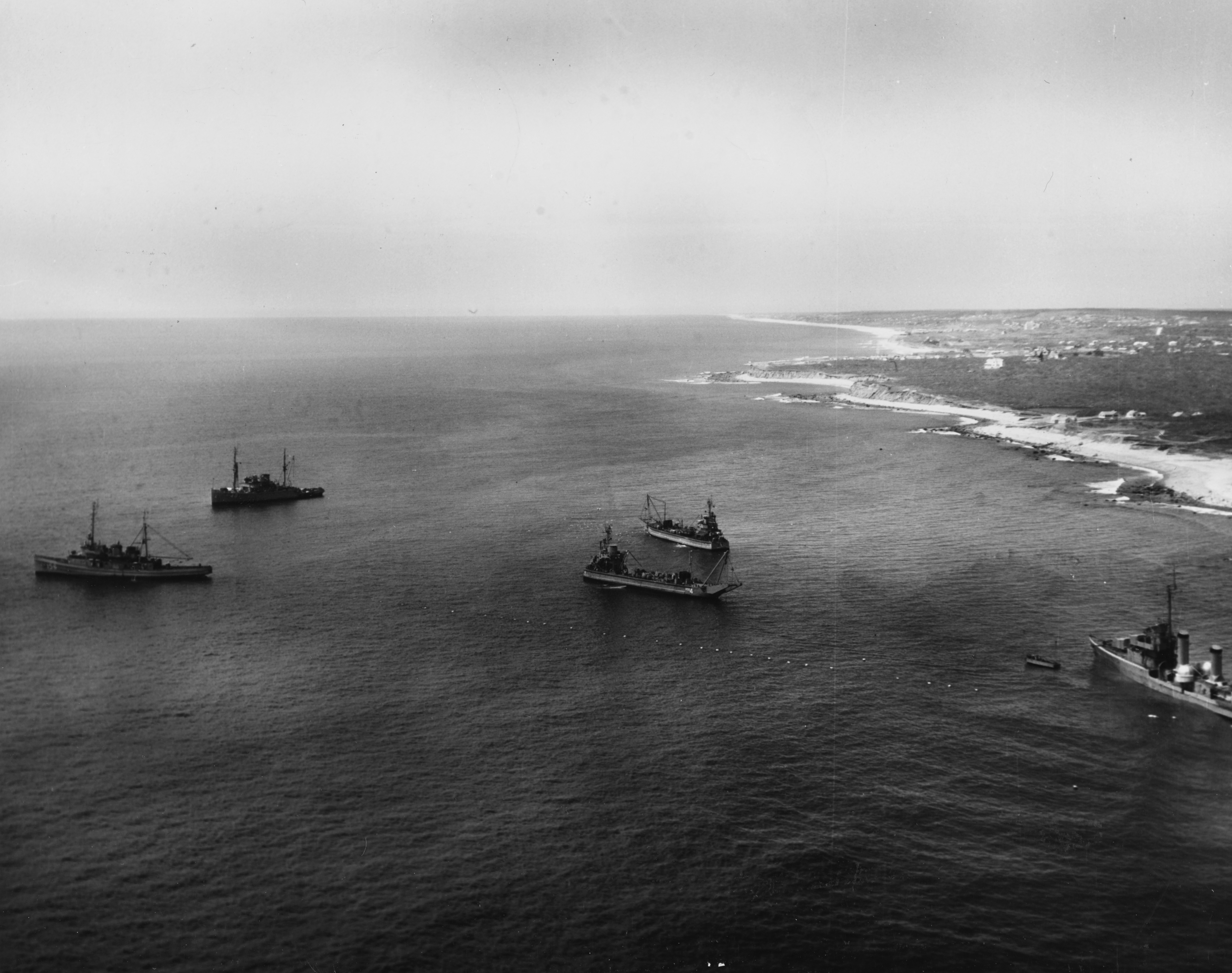
Baldwin, at right, during operations to refloat her at Montauk Point on 28 April 1961. Among the ships engaged in the salvage effort are Hoist, Salvager, Windlass, and a fleet tug (ATF).

=== 1946-1961 ===
The ship returned to the United States in January 1946 and operated along the east coast through the spring of that year. She was placed out of commission at Charleston, South Carolina, on 20 June 1946 and remained in reserve there until January 1961 when she was transferred to Atlantic Reserve Fleet, Boston. Later ordered moved to Philadelphia, Baldwin ran aground about 2 miles (3.2 km) southwest of Montauk Point, Long Island, in the early afternoon of 16 April 1961 when the towline parted during the passage to Philadelphia. Windlass successfully pulled her free, though one of Windlass' crew was killed in an accident.

Baldwin was considered not worth repairing. Her name was struck from the Navy List on 1 June 1961, and she was scuttled on 6 June 1961, not far from where she went aground.

== Awards ==
Baldwin earned three battle stars for her World War II service.
