= Gearing family =

Three generations of the Gearing family served in the United States Navy.

- Henry Chalfant Gearing (9 June 1855 – 16 August 1926) was born in Pittsburgh, Pennsylvania. He graduated from the United States Naval Academy in 1876. Gearing served on various ships of the Navy during his early years, including Lackawanna, Tuscarora, and Essex. He spent tours of duty at the Naval Academy and on board Glacier. After being promoted to commander in 1905, Gearing commanded the naval stations at Cavite and Olongapo, Philippines, until his retirement in 1909. He died 16 August 1926 in Charlottesville, Virginia.
- Henry Chalfant Gearing, Jr., (22 January 1887 – 24 February 1944) was born in Boston, Massachusetts, graduated from the Naval Academy in 1907. He served on California, Illinois, and other ships besides commanding a long list of destroyers, among them Woolsey, Dobbin, and Maury. He was appointed Captain in 1934. Subsequently, he commanded Destroyer Squadron 4 and Naval Training Station, San Diego, California before his death 24 February 1944 in San Diego Naval Hospital.
- Henry Chalfant Gearing III, (16 August 1912 – 13 November 1942) was born in Vallejo, California, and graduated from the Naval Academy in 1935. After serving several ships as a young officer, he joined Juneau as a lieutenant in 1942, and was lost with his ship when it was torpedoed and sunk in the Battle of Guadalcanal 13 November 1942.

USS Gearing (DD-710) was named for these three generations of naval men.
