= Santa Maria hijacking =

1961 hijack of Portuguese ship

News video of the release of hostages (in Dutch)

The Santa Maria hijacking was carried out on 22 January 1961 when Portuguese and Spanish political rebels seized control of a Portuguese passenger ship, aiming to force political change in Portugal. The action was also known as Operation Dulcineia, the code name given by its chief architect and leader, Portuguese military officer, writer and politician Henrique Galvão, who had been exiled in Caracas, Venezuela since 1959. After United States naval intervention, the ship arrived in Brazil, and the hijacking ended on 2 February when the rebels were given political asylum there.

== The ship ==
Owned by the Lisbon-based Companhia Colonial de Navegação, the 609-foot-long (186 m) 20,900-ton ship was the second largest ship in the Portuguese merchant navy at the time, and along with her sister ship, Vera Cruz, was among the most luxurious Portuguese-flag liners.

The ship was primarily used for colonial trade to the Portuguese overseas provinces of Angola and Mozambique, in Africa, and migrant transportation to Brazil. The ship's mid-Atlantic service was also viewed as rather out of the ordinary: Lisbon to Madeira, to Tenerife, to La Guaira, to Curaçao, to Havana (later San Juan), and lastly Port Everglades. The average trade for this gray-hulled ship was mostly migrants to Venezuela and the general passenger traffic.

== Hijacking ==
On 22 January 1961, the ship had 600 passengers and 300 crew members. Among the passengers were men, women, children, and 24 Iberian leftists led by Henrique Galvão.

Henrique Galvão was a Portuguese military officer and political opponent of Portuguese dictator António de Oliveira Salazar, the head of the Estado Novo regime. Galvão had carefully planned the hijacking in Caracas with the intention of waging war until Salazar was overthrown in Portugal and the overseas territories were subsequently offered independence. He planned on using the hijacking as a way to bring attention to the Estado Novo in Portugal and the related fascist regime in Francoist Spain.

The rebels had boarded the ship in La Guaira (Venezuela) and in Willemstad (Curaçao), disguised as passengers, bringing aboard suitcases that had secret compartments to hide their weapons. In the early hours of 22 January, rebels, along with Henrique Galvão, seized the ship and shut down all communication. One officer (3rd Pilot Nascimento Costa) was killed and several others wounded in the process of taking control of the ship. The rebels forced Captain Mário Simões Maia and his crew to divert the ship eastwards. The next day they called at Saint Lucia, then a British possession, to drop off Costa's body and some injured crewmen in a launch; but, speaking only Portuguese, the sailors were unable to successfully communicate what had happened to their ship until after it had left.

The whereabouts of the ship then remained unknown for several days, until an extensive air and sea search by the Americans, British, and Dutch discovered her and established communication in mid-Atlantic. Subsequently, a United States Navy fleet, including four destroyers and USS Hermitage (which carried a detachment of Marines from "G" Company, 2nd Battalion of the 6th Marine Regiment from Camp Lejeune, North Carolina) under the overall command of Rear Admiral Allen E. Smith, cut short Galvão's plans when they surrounded Santa Maria some 50 miles (80 km) off Recife, Brazil. The following day, Admiral Smith left his flagship, USS Gearing, and proceeded via launch to Santa Maria to begin negotiations with Galvão.

Because of an anticipated change of presidency in Brazil (the incoming President Jânio Quadros being more sympathetic to Galvão's political interests), it was not until the next day that Santa Maria, surrounded by United States naval vessels, entered the harbor of Recife. There, on 2 February, Galvão and his 24 activists surrendered Santa Maria, 600 passengers and crew of 300 to Brazilian authorities in exchange for political asylum.

Galvão later announced that his intention had been to sail to Angola, to set up a rebel Portuguese government in opposition to Salazar.

== Legacy ==
Henrique Galvão wrote his account of the hijacking as A Minha Cruzada Pró-Portugal. Santa Maria (São Paulo, Livraria Martins, 1961), translated as Santa Maria: my crusade for Portugal (Cleveland OH, World Publishing/London, Weidenfeld & Nicolson, 1961).

The story of the hijacking was told in the 2010 Portuguese feature film Assalto ao Santa Maria.
