= USS Basilone =

Gearing-class destroyer

Coordinates: 29°52′N 79°58′W

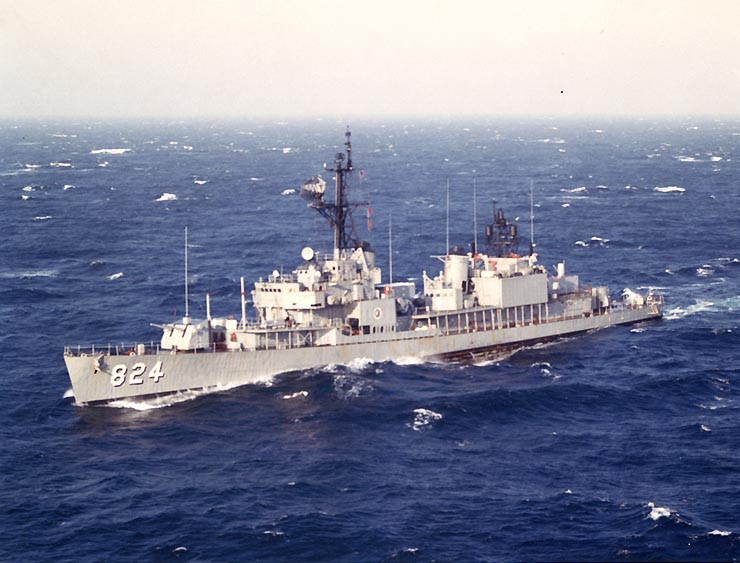
- USS Basilone underway at sea, c. late 1960s or early 1970s

History

United States
- Name: USS Basilone
- Namesake: John Basilone
- Builder: Consolidated Steel Corporation, Orange, Texas
- Laid down: 7 July 1945
- Launched: 21 December 1945
- Commissioned: 26 July 1949
- Decommissioned: 1 November 1977
- Reclassified: DDE-824, 28 January 1948; DD-824, 7 August 1962
- Stricken: 1 November 1977
- Identification: Callsign: NAYQ; Hull number: DD-824
- Honors and awards: 3 battle stars (Vietnam)
- Fate: Sunk in exercise, 9 April 1982

General characteristics
- Class & type: Gearing-class destroyer
- Displacement: 2,425 long tons (2,464 t)
- Length: 390 ft 6 in (119.02 m)
- Beam: 40 ft 10 in (12.45 m)
- Draft: 14 ft 4 in (4.37 m)
- Propulsion: Geared turbines, 2 shafts, 60,000 shp (45 MW)
- Speed: 35 knots (65 km/h; 40 mph)
- Range: 4,500 nmi (8,300 km) at 20 kn (37 km/h; 23 mph)
- Complement: 345
- Armament: 6 × 5"/38 caliber guns; 12 × 40 mm AA guns; 11 × 20 mm AA guns; 6 × depth charge projectors; 2 × depth charge tracks

USS Basilone (DD/DDE-824) was a Gearing-class destroyer of the United States Navy, named for Gunnery Sergeant John Basilone (1916–1945), who was awarded the Medal of Honor for "extraordinary heroism and conspicuous gallantry in action...." in the defense of Henderson Field during the 1942 Guadalcanal campaign.

== Construction and commissioning ==
Basilone was laid down on 7 July 1945 at Orange, Texas, by the Consolidated Steel Corporation, Ltd; launched on 21 December 1945; and sponsored by Sgt Lena Mae Basilone, USMCWR, GySgt John Basilone's widow. After lying inactive for more than two years, the ship was slated for conversion to an escort destroyer (DDE).

USS Navajo towed Basilone from Orange, Texas, to Quincy, Massachusetts, where the ship was converted by the Bethlehem Steel Co. Redesignated DDE-824 on 28 January 1948, Basilone was commissioned on 26 July 1949. The designation "DDE" stood for "escort destroyer". Escort destroyers were modified destroyers with their torpedo tubes removed to make space for more anti-aircraft guns.

== Service history ==
=== 1949–1954 ===
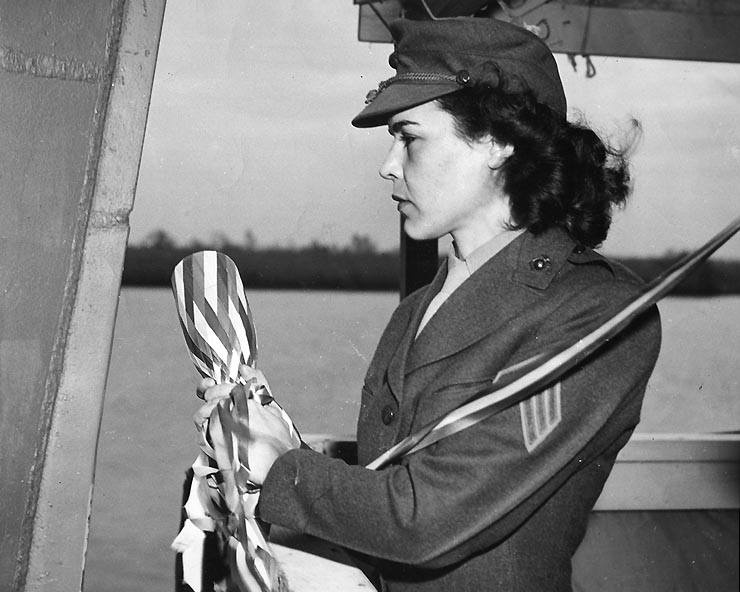
Sgt. Lena Mae Basilone, USMC(WR), widow of John Basilone, prepares to christen the destroyer USS Basilone (21 December 1945).

Following commissioning, Basilone proceeded to Guantanamo Bay, Cuba, whence she carried out shakedown training during late October and November. She returned to New England to spend Christmas in Boston, Massachusetts, before concluding shakedown at Key West in January 1950. On 1 February, the escort destroyer returned to Boston for a seven-week post-shakedown availability. After putting in at Norfolk, Virginia, on 24 March, Basilone conducted local operations and served as a unit of the Surface Anti-Submarine School at Key West during the rest of 1950 and most of 1951. She spent late November and early December in the West Indies conducting training and then returned to Norfolk where she occupied the rest of the year and the first quarter of 1952 preparing for her first deployment to the Mediterranean.

On 18 April 1952, the escort destroyer departed Norfolk, loaded ammunition, and headed for Tangier, Morocco. Following Mediterranean operations in mid-May, Basilone visited Sicily; Marseille, France; Naples, Italy; and Gibraltar before leaving the Mediterranean on 17 June. After a brief replenishment stop in the Azores, the warship stood into Norfolk on the 28th. With the exceptions of an amphibious exercise at Onslow Beach, North Carolina, in August and a repair period at the New York Naval Shipyard in September, she spent most of the summer close to Norfolk until deploying to the Mediterranean once again on 22 September. Basilone reached Tangier on 6 October and touched briefly at Gibraltar before joining the 6th Fleet. Aside from the usual operations, the escort destroyer visited Naples; Augusta, Sicily; Cannes, France; and Algiers, Algeria before departing the Mediterranean via Gibraltar on 26 November.

Basilone returned to Norfolk early in December and began a period of leave and upkeep. At the end of the first week in 1953, she resumed normal operations out of Norfolk and remained so engaged until the beginning of February when she headed south to the West Indies to carry out several weeks of anti-submarine warfare (ASW) drills. Late in March, the warship reentered Norfolk to prepare for another tour of duty with the 6th Fleet. She put to sea on her way back to the Mediterranean on 17 April. Basilone served with the 6th Fleet for about three months, returning to Norfolk late in June. The escort destroyer then entered the Norfolk Naval Shipyard for a brief availability before making a series of short cruises from her homeport to Key West, Mayport, Florida, and San Juan, Puerto Rico In September, she operated locally out of Norfolk and then underwent a tender availability in October preparatory to beginning a three-month regular overhaul at the Norfolk Naval Shipyard on 4 November.

Basilone completed the repair and maintenance work on 11 February 1954 and resumed an active employment schedule. She sailed south to Guantanamo Bay, Cuba, whence she completed her post-overhaul refresher training. After returning to Norfolk in mid-April, the warship readied herself to deploy to the Mediterranean once more, embarking on that assignment on 4 May. Basilone participated in 6th Fleet exercises throughout the summer months and, while doing so, called at ports from Algeria to Turkey. She spent considerable time off the French Riviera where took part in festivities celebrating the 10th anniversary of the Allied landings in World War II. In September, she headed back to the United States, arriving back in Norfolk on 28 September. After a tender availability, Basilone resumed a normal schedule of operations, largely competitive division exercises conducted locally off the Virginia Capes during November.

=== 1955–1962 ===
February and March 1955 found Basilone under the operational control of ComAntiSubLant participating in a series of ASW helicopter evaluation exercises. She spent most of April in port at Norfolk undergoing a tender availability and carried out type training near the Virginia Capes in May. From early June to early August, the warship took part in a midshipman training cruise to European waters, during which she visited Valencia, Spain; Weymouth, England; and Guantanamo Bay, Cuba. Basilone returned to Norfolk on 4 August and commenced a pre-overhaul tender availability that she had to interrupt twice to get underway to evade two hurricanes. Finally though, after almost three weeks of service to the Operational Development Force, the escort destroyer entered the Philadelphia Naval Shipyard on 13 September to begin a three-month overhaul. Basilone completed the repairs just in time to return to Norfolk for Christmas.

Basilone spent the first quarter of 1956 pierside at Norfolk. In April, when she finally did get underway, she ventured only as far as the waters of Chesapeake Bay. At the end of April, however, the warship embarked on a training cruise that took her to the West Indies. Returning to Norfolk in mid-June, Basilone spent the summer of 1956 engaged first in a familiarization cruise for West Point Cadets and then in a training cruise for Naval Academy midshipmen to Halifax, Nova Scotia. In September, she participated in Exercise "New Broom VI" then toured NATO countries for advanced ASW exercises. In November, the destroyer escort sailed to the Mediterranean to supplement the 6th Fleet during the Suez Crisis. Basilone returned to Norfolk in mid-December.

Over the next five years, the warship continued to alternate tours of duty with the 6th Fleet with periods of service along the east coast and in the West Indies while based at Norfolk. During her deployment to the Mediterranean Sea in the summer of 1958, Basilone joined other 6th Fleet units in patrolling the coast of Lebanon in response to internal political upheavals in that country.

In 1962, however, a break came in her east coast-Mediterranean cycle of operations. After conducting local ASW exercises during mid-January and making a futile round-trip voyage to Mayport, Florida, and back late in the month to support the recovery of Col. John Glenn's Mercury flight which had to be delayed because of weather and technical difficulties, Basilone again departed Norfolk on 17 February along with her eight DesRon 36 squadron mates to rendezvous with the aircraft carrier Wasp for the voyage across the Atlantic. The task group paused near Bermuda to assist with the recovery of Col. Glenn's space capsule and then resumed the journey to northern European waters.

The task group stopped at Portsmouth, England, between 28 February and 7 March and visited Rotterdam in the Netherlands from the 15th to the 22nd. From Rotterdam, the warships crossed the North Sea to call at Glasgow, Scotland, between 30 March and 5 April and carried out exercises in nearby waters until 8 April when they moored at Moville, Ireland. After a visit to Plymouth from 12 April to 24, Basilone recrossed the North Sea early in May to stop at Flensburg, Germany, for 10 days from the 4th to the 14th. The escort destroyer and her colleagues then spent a week at Moss, Norway, between 21 May and 28 and conducted more exercises at sea before returning to Norfolk on 16 June.

Basilone stayed in port at Norfolk until early August. On 7 August, the same day that she resumed local underway activity, the warship was reclassified a destroyer and redesignated DD-824. The destroyer conducted ASW training with Wasp and the submarine Scorpion and then paid a visit to New York City from 18 August to 22. During the month between 23 August and 24 September, Basilone carried out normal training missions in the Virginia Capes operating area. Near the end of September, she left Norfolk on her way south for and extended period of drills and exercises in the West Indies. The eruption of the Cuban Missile Crisis in mid-October, found Basilone still engaged in training operations out of Guantanamo Bay. She immediately joined the "quarantine" of Cuba that finally forced the removal of the Russian nuclear missiles from the island; Basilone served on the quarantine from 24 October to 18 November 1962.

=== 1963–1966 ===
She returned to Norfolk for the last weeks of 1962. After holiday stand down, the warship resumed local operations during the second week of January 1963. In mid-February, Basilone returned to the West Indies where she carried out a month of training near Puerto Rico. She reentered Norfolk on 21 March and, for the next ten weeks, got underway infrequently and only operated locally. In June 1963 Basilone was assigned North Atlantic duties to provide a homing beacon off the coast of Ireland for President Kennedy's pending flight to Europe. While on station for the flight, Basilone sustained a serious crack in her hull near the keel during a severe North Atlantic storm. (Waves were estimated to be at approximately 100 ft (30 m) in size) The crack was leaking over 10 US gallons (38 L; 8.3 imp gal) a minute and was getting worse. Welding repairs attempts were unsuccessful and an emergency repair attempt at the shipyard in Londonderry, Ireland 400 mi (640 km) away was denied. Basilone was ordered to stay on station until Air Force One radioed receipt of Basilone's homing beacon. Basilone was then to be immediately released approximately 25 June for return to Norfolk, Virginia. D & S Piers for a pierside repair attempt. When the pierside repair attempt was deemed unsuccessful, Basilone was dispatched to Yorktown, Virginia, to unload ammunition and then sent on to the Portsmouth Naval Shipyard for drydock repairs on the hull.

In preparation for overhaul and modernization she left Norfolk on 27 July bound for the Philadelphia Naval Shipyard. From July 1963 to 26 April 1964, Basilone underwent a Fleet Rehabilitation and Modernization (FRAM I) overhaul at the Philadelphia Naval Shipyard. Modifications completed, the destroyer followed her arrival at her new homeport of Newport, Rhode Island, on 1 May with three weeks of shakedown training at Newport and Norfolk.

On 18 May 1964, she departed Newport to fulfill a familiar role as sonar school training ship at Key West en route to the West Indies where the warship underwent refresher training during June and the first half of July. Upon arrival back at Newport on 24 July, Basilone enjoyed three weeks of leave and tender availability. For a week in August and over two weeks in September, she participated in ASW operations that included two fleet exercises. After three more weeks of upkeep and another assignment to the sonar school at Key West, the destroyer sailed to Guantanamo Bay to act as a gunfire support duty ship during the last week of October. On 27 November, following three weeks of preparation at Newport, Basilone commenced a four-month tour of duty with the 6th Fleet, serving primarily in the screen of a carrier task force in the western Mediterranean and visiting ports in Spain, Italy, and Mallorca. Following her return to Norfolk in March 1965, upkeep, maintenance, and the installation of a drone antisubmarine helicopter (DASH) system occupied her attention until early June. From late June until early September, midshipman summer training cruises took up most of the destroyer's time. During this period, Basilone also took part in numerous antisubmarine warfare (ASW) exercises, many of which were carried out in cooperation with British, Canadian, and German naval units. Although tender availability at Newport occupied the destroyer for most of the rest of 1965, she did get underway to aid the aborted Gemini VI mission in October and spent two weeks engaged in ASW and amphibious exercises involving substantial Atlantic Fleet forces early in December.

On 26 January 1966, a week after departing Newport, Basilone transited the Panama Canal to complete the first leg of her passage to join Task Force 77 (TF 77) on Dixie Station off South Vietnam. After 10 days plane-guarding the aircraft carrier Ticonderoga, the destroyer closed the shore to provide gunfire support in the IV Corps area from 14 to 19 March. She briefly assumed a picket station in the Tonkin Gulf before steaming to Subic Bay and Hong Kong for rest and replenishment. On 9 April, Basilone rejoined Ticonderoga, this time for two weeks on Yankee Station off North Vietnam.

Following a 15-day availability at Kaohsiung, Taiwan, she sailed to waters off II Corps area on 7 May to provide gunfire support, including a two-day trip up the Saigon River to bombard Viet Cong targets on the 24th. After departing the Saigon River, she contributed her firepower to an air attack and shore landing against a concentration of the Viet Cong. After another tender availability at Taiwan, Basilone returned to the II Corps area on 10 June where frequent requests for gunfire support kept her busy. On 4 July, the warship stood into Subic Bay in preparation for a return trip to Newport via the Suez Canal and Gibraltar. On 17 August, Basilone arrived at Newport and commenced a month-long tender upkeep before resuming local ASW operations. During the remainder of 1966, she only interrupted this pattern for a two-day liberty in Bermuda in mid-November and a major Atlantic Fleet exercise.

=== 1967–1970 ===
During the latter half of January 1967, Basilone twice sailed to the Virginia Capes for type training that lasted four days and a week, respectively. A two-week tender availability alongside the destroyer tender Grand Canyon preceded her departure for refresher training on 13 February. On 10 March, the warship put into the Boston Naval Shipyard to receive a new 5-inch gun mount in place of one severely damaged in a storm the previous November. On 11 April, she sailed to Newport where preparations commenced for another Mediterranean deployment.

Basilone got underway for European waters on 2 May and changed operational control to the 6th Fleet at Gibraltar nine days later, and set sail for operations off southern Italy the next day. As tensions escalated between Egypt and Israel before the Six-Day War, the destroyer joined other 6th Fleet units on alert status. After 29 days at sea, she stopped at Souda Bay, Crete, on 9 June long enough to embark midshipmen for a training cruise. Most of the month's activities consisted of exercises with TF 60 off Crete with the exceptions of liberty calls at Souda Bay and Valletta, Malta. On 3 July, problems with a service generator forced the warship back to Crete for repairs. During July, she remained at Crete performing administrative duties as the only American ship present until relieved on the 23rd. Basilone conducted ASW surveillance operations and port visits to southern France, Menorca, and Malta prior to departing Rota, Spain on 12 September. Upon returning to Newport, upkeep and training exercises occupied the destroyer prior to serving as an ASW school ship at Naval Station Key West, Florida

Following her return to Newport on 11 December, Basilone moored alongside the destroyer tender Cascade in preparation for an upcoming overhaul at the Boston Naval Shipyard which commenced on 11 January 1968. In addition to the usual aspects of an overhaul, she improved her communications, electronics, and sonar equipment before returning to Newport on 21 May. The destroyer conducted refresher training at Guantanamo Bay during June and July then returned to Newport for a month of upkeep, local operations, and preparations for a scheduled deployment to a 7th Fleet assignment. However, the warship received orders to deploy to the 6th Fleet instead. Basilone departed Newport on 5 September and relieved the destroyer Gearing at Mallorca 11 days later. Following a five-day stay at Malta, the warship participated in the surveillance of the Soviet helicopter carrier Moskva until 4 November when she shadowed the helicopter and towed sonar flattop to the entrance of the Dardanelles then put into Kavalla, Greece, for a week. En route to Mallorca, Basilone participated in a NATO exercise in the Aegean Sea then stood into Naples on 7 December for a 12-day tender availability. The destroyer finished the year in Cannes, France (port was made in Toulon France), joining Exercise "Lafayette" during her four-day transit.

On 3 January 1969, she got underway for 10 days of task group operations after which she visited Tunis en route to turnover at Mallorca on the 18th. After reaching Newport on the 30th, Basilone underwent leave and upkeep, including a tender availability alongside the destroyer tender Puget Sound. On 13 March, she began training officers attending the Destroyer School. On 8 April, the destroyer completed the training assignment and returned to Newport for another tender availability. Engineering problems delayed her departure until 19 May, after which she took part in two fleet exercises, one of which included NATO forces. Following upkeep and inspections that occupied her from 13 June to 22 July, Basilone participated in ASW exercises with 2nd Fleet units and then carried out torpedo and ASW missile exercises in the West Indies. Upon her return to Newport on 26 August, she began a three-week tender availability in preparation for a 7th Fleet assignment. However, the warship received orders to deploy to the 6th Fleet instead, while another availability to correct boiler problems kept her in port until 11 November. The next day, the destroyer steered the familiar course to the Mediterranean and relieved the destroyer Ault on 21 November. Aside from the usual task force operations, Basilone visited Malta; Tunis; İzmir, Turkey; Athens, Greece; and Naples, Italy.

Her return to Newport on 22 May afforded the ship and crew a much anticipated two months of rest and replenishment. With the exception of two days of pre-deployment ASW services provided to the submarine Tullibee in late July and a four-day port visit to New York City early in August, Basilone remained in Newport hosting the sailors' families, Navy War College staff members and students and acting as a spectator ship for the 1970 America's Cup yacht race. On 23 September, the destroyer was relieved of that assignment and once again set sail for the Eastern Mediterranean to participate in task force operations in support of King Hussein of Jordan during the Black September conflict. During this episode, Basilone changed operational control to the 6th Fleet on 2 October. Aside from task force operations and gunnery exercises, she paid visits to Crete, Athens, Naples, and Mallorca before rejoining the 2d Fleet on 2 November. On the 8th, the warship returned to Newport for leave and upkeep.

=== 1971–1973 ===
Early in 1971, Basilone twice sailed to the Bahamas. During the first two weeks of February, she participated in an ASW exercise off Andros Island then returned to the Tongue of the Ocean for three weeks late in April and early in May as part of a Chief of Naval Operations (CNO) project evaluating the Mark 48 torpedo. With the exception of brief training at Norfolk in May, the destroyer remained in Newport until 16 August preparing for overhaul at the Boston Naval Shipyard. After completing the overhaul on 24 November, Basilone again steamed to the Bahamas for weapons' tests and exercises. On 15 December, she returned to Newport for leave and upkeep.

On 3 January 1972, the warship sailed to the West Indies for refresher training then returned to Newport on 13 February. With the exception of training off the Virginia Capes late in April, she remained in Newport preparing for a Pacific deployment until late May. On 5 June, Basilone got underway in company with Trippe, Joseph Hewes, and Warrington. She transited the Panama Canal on the 10th and, after stops at Oahu and Guam, arrived at Subic Bay on Independence Day ready to begin duty with the 7th Fleet. The destroyer entered Vietnamese waters on 7 July and commenced a 16-day tour plane-guarding Oriskany. On 23 July, she parted company with the Oriskany task group and closed the coast of Vietnam near the DMZ with a gunfire support unit, Task Unit 70.8.2 (TU 70.8.2), to deliver call-fire bombardment to assist the troops ashore. She completed her part in that mission on 29 July and moved off to conduct special operations in the Gulf of Tonkin with Towers and Henry B. Wilson. Three days later, Basilone joined England (DLG-22) on the northern search and rescue (SAR) station where she served until 8 August. On 10 August, after two days service with Dewey on Tartar Station, Basilone cleared the Vietnam War zone for the Philippines.

Not long after her arrival in Subic Bay, the destroyer received orders to duty with the Middle East Force. On 16 August, she departed Subic Bay in company with Trippe and the two warships made their way, via Singapore and Sri Lanka, to Manama, Bahrain, where they became units of the Middle East Force. For almost three months, she made goodwill visits to Middle Eastern ports, visiting Jidda, Saudi Arabia; Massawa and Asmara, Ethiopia; Karachi, Pakistan; Djibouti in the French Territory of the Afars and the Issas; and Mombasa, Kenya. At Mombasa, Basilone turned over her duties to her relief, Charles R. Ware, early in November and embarked on the long voyage back to the east coast of North America. Along the way, she called at Lourenço Marques, Mozambique; Luanda, Angola; Dakar, Senegal; and at Bermuda before arriving back at Newport on 2 December.

The warship remained in port at Newport through the end of the year and through the first month of 1973, resuming local activity early in February. On the afternoon of 5 February 1973, while she conducted underway training and a burial at sea off the Virginia Capes, a boiler explosion killed seven of Basilone's crew. The destroyer returned to Newport until 20 March at which time she was towed to the Boston Naval Shipyard. After nearly four months of repairs, Basilone arrived back at Newport on 30 July. On 8 August, she conducted ASW exercises with Pargo. Following refresher training at Guantanamo Bay, the warship put in at Newport for two weeks before changing her homeport to Norfolk on 1 October. In late November and early December, she participated in an Atlantic Fleet readiness exercise.

=== 1974–1977 ===
On 4 January 1974, Basilone stood out of Norfolk, commencing a six-month Mediterranean deployment. After changing operational control to 6th Fleet, the warship joined TF 60 on the 21st for ASW and electronic warfare exercises. The destroyer spent the better part of the two months between 3 February and 3 April at the Hellenic Shipyards, Skaramangas, Greece, repairing weak spots in her hull. Basilone visited Palma for two weeks in mid-April before taking part in two weeks of NATO exercises. After returning to Norfolk on 3 July, she enjoyed four months of leave, upkeep, and tender availability. Basilone got underway for task group operations on 2 November, but an engineering problem forced her into Mayport for repairs. On 19 December, she returned to Norfolk and commenced a three-month tender availability alongside Puget Sound in early 1975.

After completing sea trials on 15 April 1975, Basilone participated in a 2nd Fleet exercise during the latter half of the month. Following a month of preparation, the warship commenced a 10-day transit to the Mediterranean on 12 June. The destroyer joined John F. Kennedy for carrier operations and helped search for five airmen downed in a collision between two Navy aircraft. Rest and replenishment at Sicily and Naples occupied her time in July. After a week-long NATO exercise in August, and brief operations in the eastern Mediterranean early in September, she took part in 6th Fleet exercises during late September and early October. November brought with it a visit to Toulon, France, followed by an exercise with French naval units. After completing her part in a 6th Fleet amphibious exercise, Basilone visited Barcelona from 4 to 9 December before heading for turnover at Rota. She stopped at Rota from the 10th to the 12th and then embarked on the voyage back to Norfolk, where she arrived on the 22nd.

Following four weeks of rest and replenishment, the destroyer conducted type training with America off the Virginia Capes during the latter half of January 1976. After a tender availability during the month of February, Basilone conducted type training with Nimitz early in March and later operated with the carrier off Jacksonville, Florida, during the latter half of the month. The warship returned to Norfolk for upkeep and inspections during April and May. In June, training operations occupied her until generator repairs forced the ship to put in at Roosevelt Roads, Puerto Rico, on the 20th. Basilone made goodwill visits to Miami, Florida, and Eastport, Maine, before resuming training operations on 6 July. She made minor repairs at Mayport then returned to Norfolk on the 23rd for upkeep, replenishment, and repair that lasted until 4 November. On the 15th, the warship commenced eight days of exercises. On the 29th, the destroyer received new sonar equipment before entering drydock at the Bethlehem Steel Shipyard for nearly three weeks of repairs on 2 December.

Upon returning to Norfolk, Basilone readied herself for her last Mediterranean deployment. Following her departure from Norfolk on 15 January 1977, the destroyer paused at Rota for turnover formalities before sailing on to Naples. She reached Naples on 4 February, loaded intelligence gear, embarked communication technicians and then sailed to Skaramangas Shipyard near Athens for repairs to her port shaft. Upon completion of three weeks of repair on 7 March, Basilone visited Turkey before participating in 6th Fleet and NATO operations during the latter half of March and the first week of April. Following a 10-day tender availability at Naples, the warship resumed 6th Fleet and NATO exercises and punctuated them with visits to and upkeep in Greece; Genoa, Italy; Corsica; Sicily; and Mallorca. The destroyer departed the Mediterranean on 22 July for Norfolk where she arrived on 1 August.

== Decommissioning and disposal ==
Basilone was decommissioned on 1 November 1977, and her name was struck from the Navy List that same day. After serving as a target for missile-firing exercises, she was sunk on 9 April 1982 in the Atlantic Ocean about 80 miles (150 km) east of St. Augustine, Florida.

== Awards ==
Basilone earned three battle stars for her service in the Vietnam War.
