= Henrique Galvão =

Portuguese politician and writer (1895–1970)

Henrique Galvao
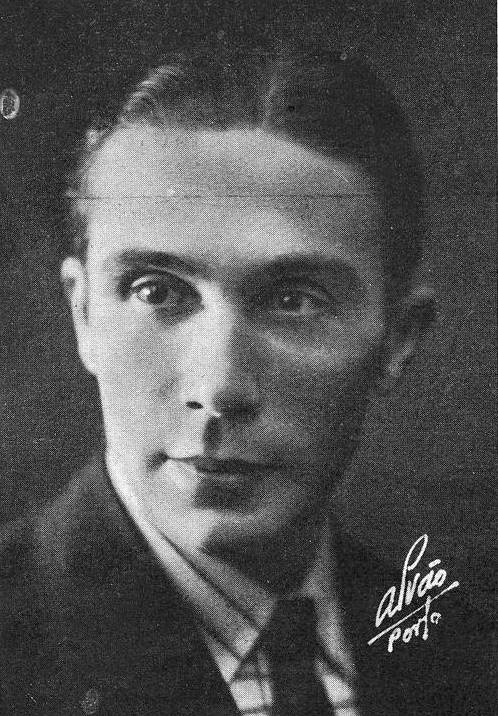

Angolan Deputy to the Assembly of the Republic (Portugal)
- Incumbent
- Assumed office 1940

Personal details
- Born: 4 February 1895 Barreiro, Barreiro, Portugal
- Died: 25 June 1970 (aged 75)

Henrique Carlos da Mata Galvão (4 February 1895 – 25 June 1970) was a Portuguese military officer, writer and politician. He was initially a supporter but later become one of the strongest opponents of the Portuguese Estado Novo under António de Oliveira Salazar.

== Career ==
On 1 August 1934 he was created a Grand-Officer of the Military Order of Our Lord Jesus Christ.

In the 1940s, while serving as the Angolan Deputy to the Portuguese National Assembly, Henrique Galvão read his "Report on Native Problems in the Portuguese Colonies" at the Assembly. In this report, Galvão condemned the "shameful outrages" he had uncovered under the then "Statute of the Indigenous", notably the forced labour of "women, of children, [and] of decrepit old men." He concluded that, in Angola, "only the dead are really exempt from forced labor". Furthermore, he stated that as many as 30% of all Angolan forced labourers died. Galvão cited the government's policy of replacing deceased native workers, without directly charging the employer, as being instrumental in encouraging the poor care of the workers. Galvão further noted that this practice would often then result in their death, and said that this state policy, which differed from policy in other colonial societies, eliminated the employer's incentive to maintain the welfare of the workers. He therefore accused the Portuguese government, due to its colonial policies, of the elimination of native workers in Angola. The Portuguese government rejected these accusations and ignored Galvão's report. While as a Minister, he was responsible for the launching of the historical documentaries presented for decades until his death by José Hermano Saraiva.

Galvão was arrested in 1952. He was compulsorily retired from his military career, where he was an Army Captain, but was awarded a state pension. In 1959, he escaped from Portugal to Venezuela, where he continued to oppose the Estado Novo at that time.

Shortly before the Portuguese Colonial War, on 22 January 1961, Galvão led the Santa Maria hijacking, also known as Operation Dulcinea. The hijackers seized the ship and took command of the vessel under Galvão's leadership. In this process, they isolated the vessel by cutting off all communication, killing one officer and wounding several others. Galvão used the hijacking to send radio broadcasts from the ship calling attention to his concerns and views on what he characterized as the fascist Portuguese regime. The event received wide international press coverage. It is understood that the hijackers forced the captain of the ship, Mário Simões Maia, along with crew members, to redirect the ship's course. One of the hijackers, Camilo Mortágua, needlessly and with the reproval of Galvão, shot and killed the third mate, João José da Conceição Costa. The liner, rebaptized Santa Liberdade, evaded both the U.S. Navy and British Royal Navy for eleven days before docking safely at Recife, Brazil. On 2 February 1961, the hijackers were met by Brazilian officials off the coast of Recife. After negotiating with Brazilian officials, Galvão released the ship's passengers in exchange for his own political asylum in Brazil. Galvão later said that his original intentions for the operation were to sail the ship to the Portuguese overseas province of Angola, where he had planned to declare the independence of Angola from the Portuguese government, in opposition to António de Oliveira Salazar's regime. Galvão remained exiled in Belo Horizonte, Brazil, where he died in 1970. He was buried in a monumental grave at the Prazeres Cemetery, in Lisbon, in the very same cemetery where the third mate killed during the Santa Maria hijacking also lies in a memorial grave.

On 7 November 1991 he was posthumously awarded with the Grand-Cross of the Order of Liberty.

== Writings ==
Henrique Galvão's writing can be seen in famous published works, including the five-volume 1933 study Da vida e da morte dos bichos: subsídios para o estudo da fauna de Angola e notas de caça (Of Animals Life and Death: Contributions to the Study of the Fauna of Angola and Hunting Notes), co-authored with Teodósio Cabral and Abel Pratas, and Outras Terras, Outras Gentes. Galvão's account of the Santa Maria hijacking was translated into English as Santa Maria: My Crusade for Portugal (New York, 1961).

== Complete written work without a translation of the work's title. ==
- Huíla: Relatório de Govêrno, 1929
- Em terra de pretos (Crónicas d'Angola), 1929
- Nacionalização de Angola: conferência, 1929
- "La Presse Coloniale et le probleme du travail indigene", 1931
- "Revolução, peça em 3 actos, 1931
- História do nosso tempo: João de Almeida (sua obra e acção), 1931 (2.ª edição, 1934)
- O poeta Lopes Vieira em Africa e o seu Relatorio, Edição do autor, 1932
- "Informação Económica sôbre Angola", 1932
- "As feiras de amostras coloniais", 1932
- "As embalagens no comércio com as Colónias", 1932
- O vélo d'oiro: romance colonial (co-escrito com Eduardo Malta), ediç. Francisco Franco, 1932
- "Um critério de povoamento europeu nas Colónias", 1933
- "Galícia en el poblamiento de las colonias portuguesas", 1933
- "A função colonial, razão de ser da nacionalidade", 1934
- "Álbum comemorativo da Primeira Exposição Colonial Portuguesa", 1934
- No rumo do Império. Ilustrações de Carlos Carneiro. Porto, Litografia Nacional, 1933? 1934?
- Terras do Feitiço (contos africanos), 1934
- Da vida e da morte dos bichos: subsídios para o estudo da fauna de Angola e notas de caça. Com Teodósio Cabral e Abel Pratas. 5 vols., Lisboa, Livraria Popular de Francisco Franco, 1934

Vol. I - Elefantes e Rinocerontes
Vol. II - O Hipopótamo, A Girafa, O Crocodilo, Os Javalis
Vol. III - O Leão
Vol. IV - Búfalos, Gorila, Leopardos, Antílopes, etc.
Vol. V - Narrativas de Caça Grossa em África

- "Primeira Exposição Colonial Portuguesa", 1935
- "O povoamento europeu nas Colónias Portuguesas", 1935
- "Portugal Colonial" (6 vol.), 1931–37
- "Dembos" (2 vol.), 1935
- "O povoamento europeu nas colónias portuguesas, 1935 (2.ª edição, 1936)
- "Como se faz um homem, peça em 4 actos", 1935
- "O velo d'oiro. Fantasia colonial em 3 actos" (adaptação teatral do romance do autor pelo próprio e João da Silva Tavares), 1936
- O sol dos trópicos: (romance colonial), Henrique Galvão, 1936, 322 p.
- "Angola (Para uma nova política colonial)", 1.º volume, 1937
- "Fisionomia do passado, aspectos de presente. Da ocupação...", 1937
- "Ronda do Império", 1937
- O Império. Lisboa, Secretariado de Propaganda Nacional, 1938
- "Colonos, peça de 1 acto", 1939
- O Império na Literatura Portuguesa, 1939
- "Clima de guerra, ao microfone da Emissora Nacional", 1939
- "Álbum Comemorativo da Secção Colonial da E. M. P.", 1940
- "Portugal, 1940: álbum comemorativo fundação : festas de...". Com Eduardo Malta e Manuel Lapa, 1940
- "Zonas colonizáveis de Angola", 1940
- Ronda de África: Outras terras, outras gentes. Viagens em Moçambique. Com Fausto Sampaio, 2 vols., Porto, Jornal de Notícias, 1941 e 1942
- "Bissaya Barreto". Tradução do livro em Francês de Pierre Goemaere, 1942
- "A caça no império português". Com António Montês e José Arantes de Freitas Cruz, 1943–45
- Kurika: romance dos bichos do mato, 1944
- Impala: romance dos bichos do mato, 1946
- "Irreverência?: (Notas à margem da política e dos costumes), 1946
- Antropófagos. Porto, editado pelo Jornal de Notícias, 1947 (2.ª ed., Lisboa, Livraria Popular Francisco Franco, 1974)
- "101 clichés fotográficos de Alvão, Porto, fotógrafo...", 194?
- Vagô: romance dos bichos do mato (também chamadoO homem e o tigre: vagô), 1954
- Por Angola: quatro anos de actividade parlamentar. Edição do autor, cerca de 1949
- Comédia da Morte e da Vida: Uma peça em três actos, seguida de duas peças em um acto: «A Mulher e o Demónio» e «Um caso raro de loucura», Lisboa, Empresa Nacional de Publicidade, 1950
- Império ultramarino português: monografia do império. Com Carlos Selvagem, 4 vols., Lisboa, Empresa Nacional de Publicidade, 1950-1953)

Vol. I (1950): Introdução; Cabo Verde; Guiné
Vol. II (1951): Guiné (continuação); S. Tomé e Príncipe
Vol. III (1952): Angola
Vol. IV (1953): Moçambique; Índia; Macau; Timor.

- Pele. Lisboa, Sociedade Gráfica Nacional, 1956
- Grades serradas, 1959
- "Relatório de Henrique Galvão e Thomaz Ribeiro Colaço". Escrito com Tomás Ribeiro Colaço para o grupo de apoiantes de Humberto Delgado, 1959
- "Os últimos dias do fascismo português: Memórias dum...". Com Maria Archer, 1959
- Carta aberta ao dr. Salazar, Buenos Aires (distribuído também em Portugal), Edição da Comissão de Libertação Nacional, 1959 (2ª edição, Caracas, igualmente distribuído também em Portugal, Movimento Nacional Independente, 1960, 3ª edição Lisboa, Arcádia, 1975)
- A Minha Cruzada Pró-Portugal. Santa Maria, São Paulo, Livraria Martins, 1961 (2.ª edição sob o título O assalto ao Santa Maria, Lisboa, Delfos, 1974
- Depoimento torpedeado: Portugal, a ONU, o salazarismo e a situação na África Portuguesa. São Paulo, Frente Antitotalitária dos Portugueses Livres Exilados, 1962
- Da minha luta contra o salazarismo e o comunismo em Portugal, São Paulo, 1965 (2.ª ed., Lisboa, Arcádia, 1976)
- "A cultura da aveleira", 1968
- Diário de Peniche, Lisboa, Livraria Popular de Francisco Franco, 1974 ou 1975
- Crónica de horas vazias, Lisboa, Livraria Popular de Francisco Franco, 1975

== Fontes ==
- As obras indicadas têm como fonte o catálogo PORBASE da Biblioteca Nacional de Portugal
- A biografia tem como fonte as seguintes obras:
  - ANTÃO, Nelson Moreira; TAVARES, Célia Gonçalves. «Henrique Galvão e o assalto ao Santa Maria. Percurso de uma dissidência do Estado Novo e suas repercussões internacionais» in Revista Sapiens, Lisboa, dezembro de 2008.
  - Castro, Pedro Jorge (2010). O Inimigo n.º 1 de Salazar. Lisboa: Esfera do Caos. ISBN 978-989-626-260-0.
  - Mota, Francisco Teixeira da (2011). Henrique Galvão: Um Herói Português. Lisboa: Oficina do Livro. ISBN 978-989-555-827-8.
  - Pacheco, Carlos. "Luzes e Sombras de Uma Insurreição: o Bluff do Desembarque em Angola", in Angola, Um Gigante com Pés de Barro e Outras Reflexões Sobre a África e o Mundo, Lisboa, Nova Vega, 4.ª edição, 2014, pp. 185–196 (ISBN 978-972-699-960-7)
  - Peres, Luis Miguel Solla de Andrade. Henrique Galvão, 1895-1970: Aspects of an Euro-african Crusade 1895-1970. University of South Africa, março de 2009.
  - «Henrique Carlos Mata Galvão», in ROSAS, Fernando; BRITO, J. M. Brandão de. Dicionário de História do Estado Novo, Venda Nova: Bertrand Editora, 1996, vol. I, pp. 378–379.
