= USS Gearing =

Gearing-class destroyer

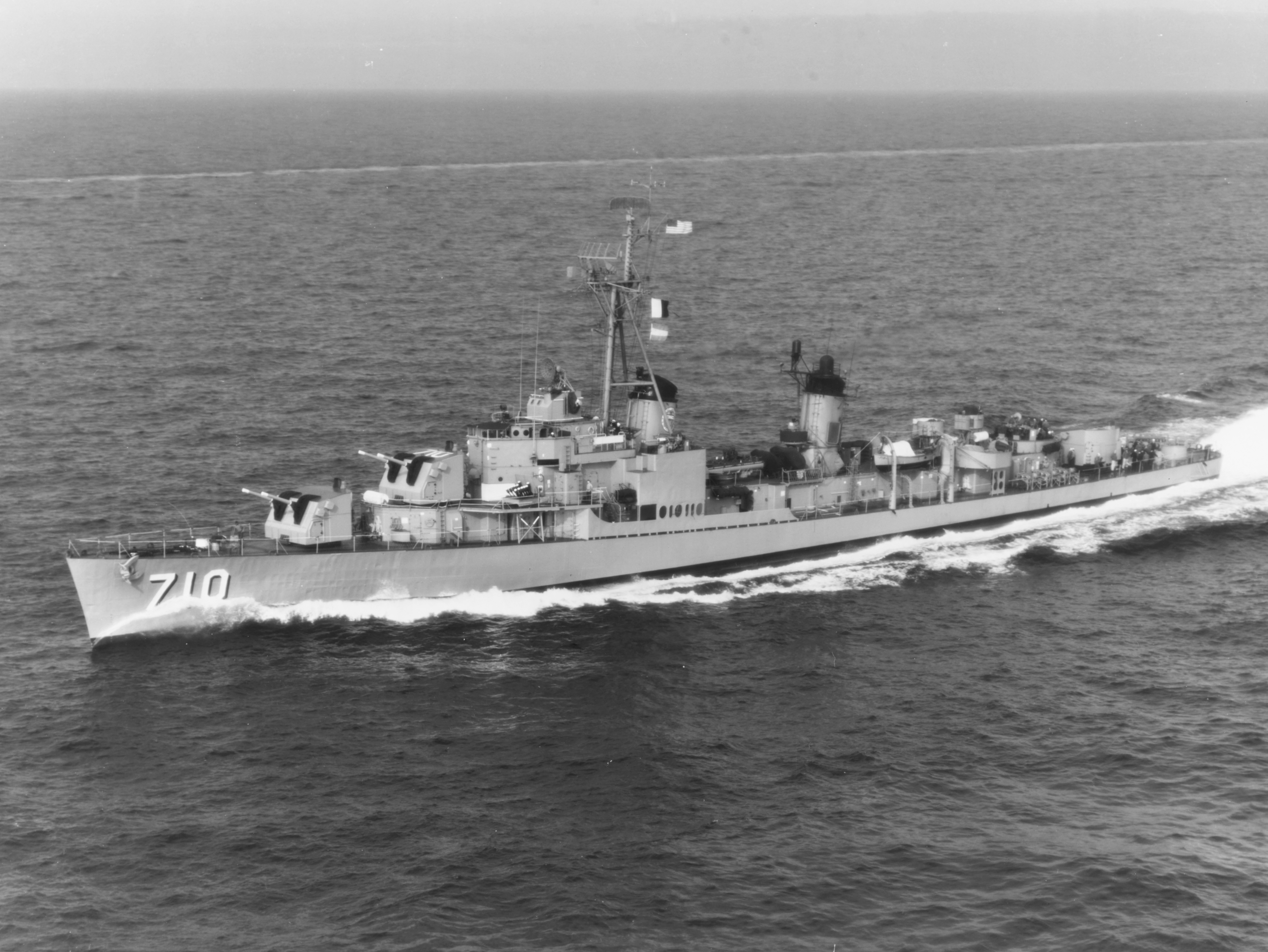
- USS Gearing (DD-710) in the Mediterranean Sea in 1960

History

United States
- Name: Gearing
- Namesake: Gearing family
- Builder: Federal Shipbuilding and Drydock Company, Kearny, New Jersey
- Laid down: 10 August 1944
- Launched: 18 February 1945
- Commissioned: 3 May 1945
- Modernized: 1964 (FRAM IB)
- Decommissioned: 1973
- Stricken: 1 July 1973
- Identification: Callsign: NKHI; Hull number: DD-710
- Fate: Sold for scrap on 6 November 1974.
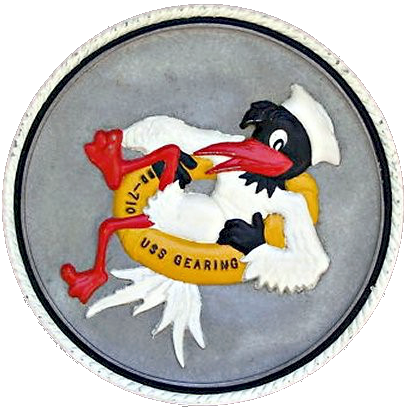
- Badge

General characteristics
- Class & type: Gearing-class destroyer
- Displacement: 2,616 tons standard; 3,460 tons full load
- Length: 390.6 ft (119.1 m)
- Beam: 40.10 ft (12.22 m)
- Draft: 14.4 ft (4.4 m)
- Propulsion: 2 shafts; General Electric steam turbines; 4 boilers; 60,000 shp (45 MW)
- Speed: 36.8 knots (68.2 km/h; 42.3 mph)
- Range: 4,500 nmi (8,330 km) at 20 knots (37 km/h)
- Complement: 336
- Armament: 6 x 5 in (130 mm) dual purpose guns; 12 x 40 mm anti-aircraft guns; 11 x 20 mm anti-aircraft guns; 10 x 21 inch (533 mm) torpedo tubes

USS Gearing (DD-710) was the lead ship of her class of destroyers in the United States Navy. She was named for three generations of the Gearing family, Commander Henry Chalfant Gearing Sr., Captain Henry Chalfant Gearing Jr. and Lieutenant Henry Chalfant Gearing, III.

== Construction ==
Gearing was launched on 18 February 1945 by the Federal Shipbuilding & Drydock Co., Kearny, New Jersey. Gearing was sponsored by Mrs. Thomas M. Foley, daughter of Commander Gearing and commissioned 3 May 1945.

== History ==
After shakedown off Cuba, Gearing reached Norfolk 22 July 1945 and trained precommissioning crews for other destroyers until putting in at Casco Bay, Maine, 5 October. Gearing put in at Pensacola, Florida, 4 November to screen the aircraft carrier Ranger during carrier qualification operations.

Returning to Norfolk 21 March 1946, she conducted peacetime operations along the Atlantic coast of North and South America, in the Caribbean, visiting Montevideo, Uruguay; and Rio de Janeiro, Brazil. Gearing sailed 10 November 1947 on her first Mediterranean cruise, calling at Algeria, Malta, Italy, and France before mooring again at Norfolk 11 March 1948.

Peacetime operations along the eastern seaboard and in the Caribbean prepared her for a second cruise to European waters; the destroyer visited most of the nations washed by the Mediterranean from 10 November 1947 to 11 March 1948 and duplicated this long voyage from 4 January to 23 May 1949.

During the fall of 1949 Gearing took part in Operation Frostbite, an Arctic cruise test and development of cold weather techniques and equipment. She continued operations off the east coast of the United States and in the Caribbean through 1950. Another voyage from 10 January to 17 May 1951 brought her from Norfolk to the Mediterranean and return; the remainder of the year was occupied by training cruises as far north as Halifax and south to Cuban waters.

By now Gearing had established the pattern of peacetime operations she followed well into the 1960s: "Med" cruises usually once a year, and exercise in the Atlantic and Caribbean. These kept her in fighting trim for the ceaseless duties of seapower. She also took part in negotiations during the Santa Maria hijacking, and was modernized and overhauled late 1961 through early 1962 at Boston.

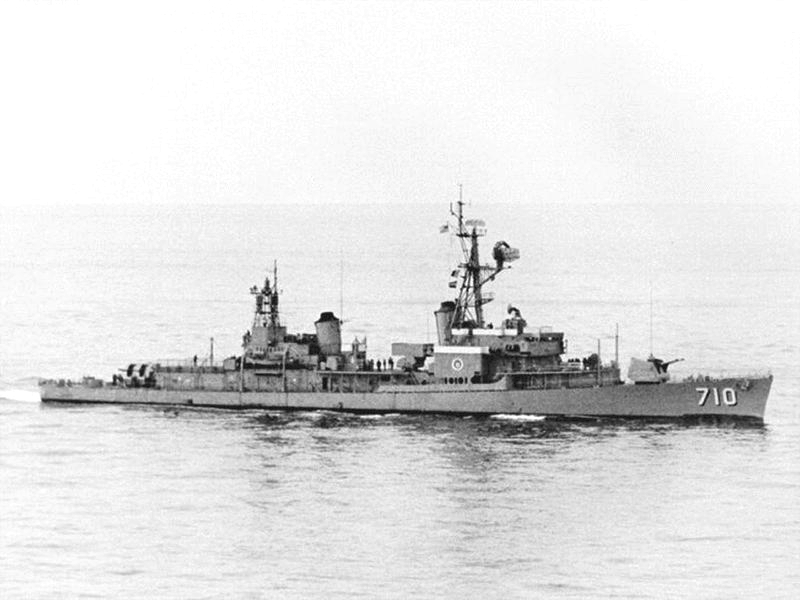
Gearing after her FRAM I modernisation, in 1967.

In October 1962 Gearing took part in the American naval blockade of Cuba in response to Cuban Missile Crisis, the basing of Soviet ballistic missiles on that island, and was the first to intercept a Soviet vessel. After diplomatic negotiations ended this crisis, Gearing returned to Norfolk on 1 November 1962. Through the remainder of 1962 she continued operations in the Atlantic.

After participating in Operation "Springboard-63" early in 1963, Gearing sailed for the Mediterranean in March serving with the 6th Fleet during the summer. She returned to Newport in September for a "FRAM I" overhaul. Following operations in the Caribbean and North Atlantic in the spring and summer of 1964, Gearing entered the Mediterranean on 4 October to rejoin the 6th Fleet. After returning home early in 1965, she continued operating in the Atlantic Fleet into 1967.

She was decommissioned in 1973, stricken on 1 July 1973 and sold for scrap on 6 November 1974.
