= Kountouriotis =

Kountouriotis may refer to:

== People ==
- Pavlos Kountouriotis
- Georgios Kountouriotis
- Lazaros Kountouriotis
- Christos Kountouriotis

== Ships ==
- Greek ship Kountouriotis
- HNS Kountouriotis (D-213)
- Greek destroyer Kountouriotis (1931)
- Greek frigate Kountouriotis (F-462)
