= United States Fleet Activities Yokosuka =

United States Navy base in Yokosuka, Japan

Coordinates: 35.2932°N 139.671293°E

- Yokosuka, Japan
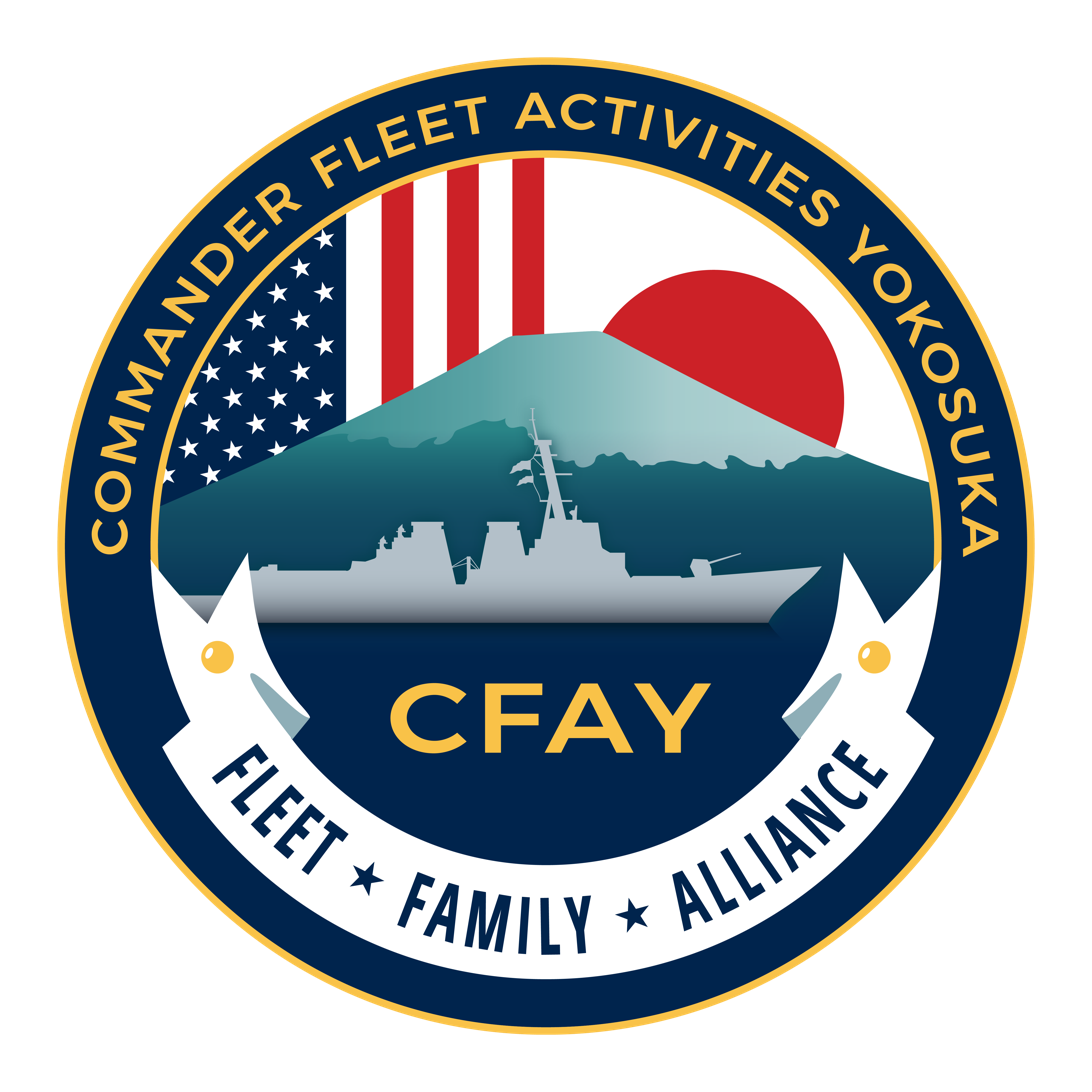
- U.S. Fleet Activities Yokosuka logo

Site information
- Type: Military Base
- Controlled by: Japan (1870s–1945); United States (1945–present)

Site history
- Built: 1870
- In use: 1870–present
- Battles/wars: Served as support in naval battles during World War II Asiatic-Pacific Theater, Korean War, Vietnam War

Garrison information
- Current commander: Captain Jonathan Hopkins
- Past commanders: Vice Admiral Robert L. Thomas; Oliver O. Kessing
- Garrison: United States Seventh Fleet

United States Fleet Activities Yokosuka (横須賀海軍施設, Yokosuka kaigun-shisetsu) or Commander Fleet Activities Yokosuka (横須賀艦隊活動司令官 or 横須賀艦隊基地隊, Yokosuka kantai katsudō Shirei-kan or Yokosuka kantai kichi-tai) is a United States Navy base in Yokosuka, Japan. Its mission is to maintain and operate base facilities for the logistic, recreational, administrative support and service of the U.S. Naval Forces Japan, Seventh Fleet and other operating forces assigned in the Western Pacific. CFAY is the largest strategically important U.S. naval installation in the western Pacific.

Fleet Activities Yokosuka comprises 2.3 km^{2} (568 acres) and is located at the entrance of Tokyo Bay, 65 km (40 mi) south of Tokyo and approximately 30 km (20 mi) south of Yokohama on the Miura Peninsula in the Kantō region of the Pacific Coast in Central Honshu, Japan.

The 55 tenant commands which make up this installation support U.S. Navy Pacific operating forces, including principal afloat elements of the United States Seventh Fleet, including the only permanently forward-deployed aircraft carrier, USS George Washington (CVN-73), the group she heads, Carrier Strike Group Five, and Destroyer Squadron 15.

== History ==
When Commodore Matthew Perry arrived in Japan in 1853, using naval pressure to open up Japan to foreign trade, Yokosuka was a quaint, native fishing village. In 1860, Lord Oguri Kozukenosuke, Minister of Finance to the Tokugawa Shogunate Government, decided that "If Japan is to assume an active role in world trade, she must have proper facilities to build and maintain large seagoing vessels." He called upon the French Consul General, Léon Roches, and asked for the assistance of the French government to build a shipyard and various basing facilities capable of handling large ships. French engineer Léonce Verny was sent to Japan to accomplish the task.

After the inspection of several sites, it was discovered that Yokosuka topographically, if on a smaller scale, resembled the port of Toulon, France. It was decided to establish the shipyard here. It would be called the "Yokosuka Iron Works". In 1871, the name was changed to the "Yokosuka Navy Yard". It was French engineer Louis-Émile Bertin who reorganized "Yokosuka Navy Yard" completely from 1886.

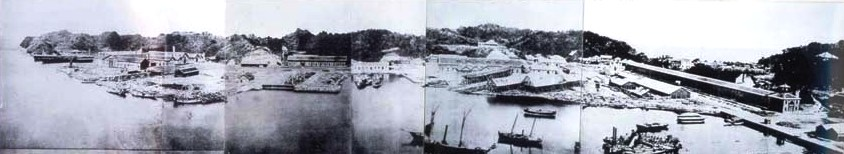
Construction of the Yokosuka arsenal c.1870.

Yokosuka was to become one of the main arsenals of the Imperial Japanese Navy into the 20th century. Battleships such as Yamashiro, and aircraft carriers such as Hiryu and Shokaku were built there. Major naval aircraft were also designed at the Yokosuka Naval Air Technical Arsenal. In addition, numerous other facilities, including the headquarters of various naval units, administration buildings, military training schools, airfields, communication facilities, barracks, armories and a military hospital were established nearby in the course of its history, turning the area around the arsenal into a major fleet base.

During World War II, activities at the Yokosuka Navy Yard reached their peak. By 1944, it covered 280 acres (1.1 km^{2}) and employed over 40,000 workers. In addition to the shipbuilding plant, the yard also had a gun factory, ordnance and supply depots, a fuel storage facility, a seaplane base, and a naval air station.

== U.S. Navy base ==
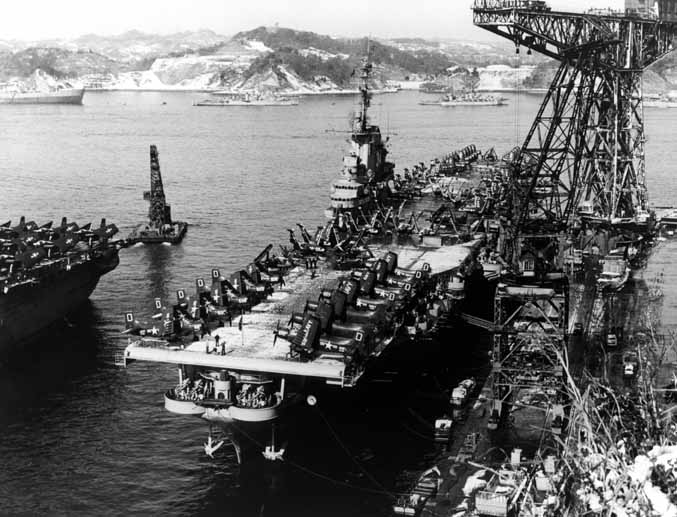
USS Oriskany (CVA-34) at Yokosuka, circa 1952

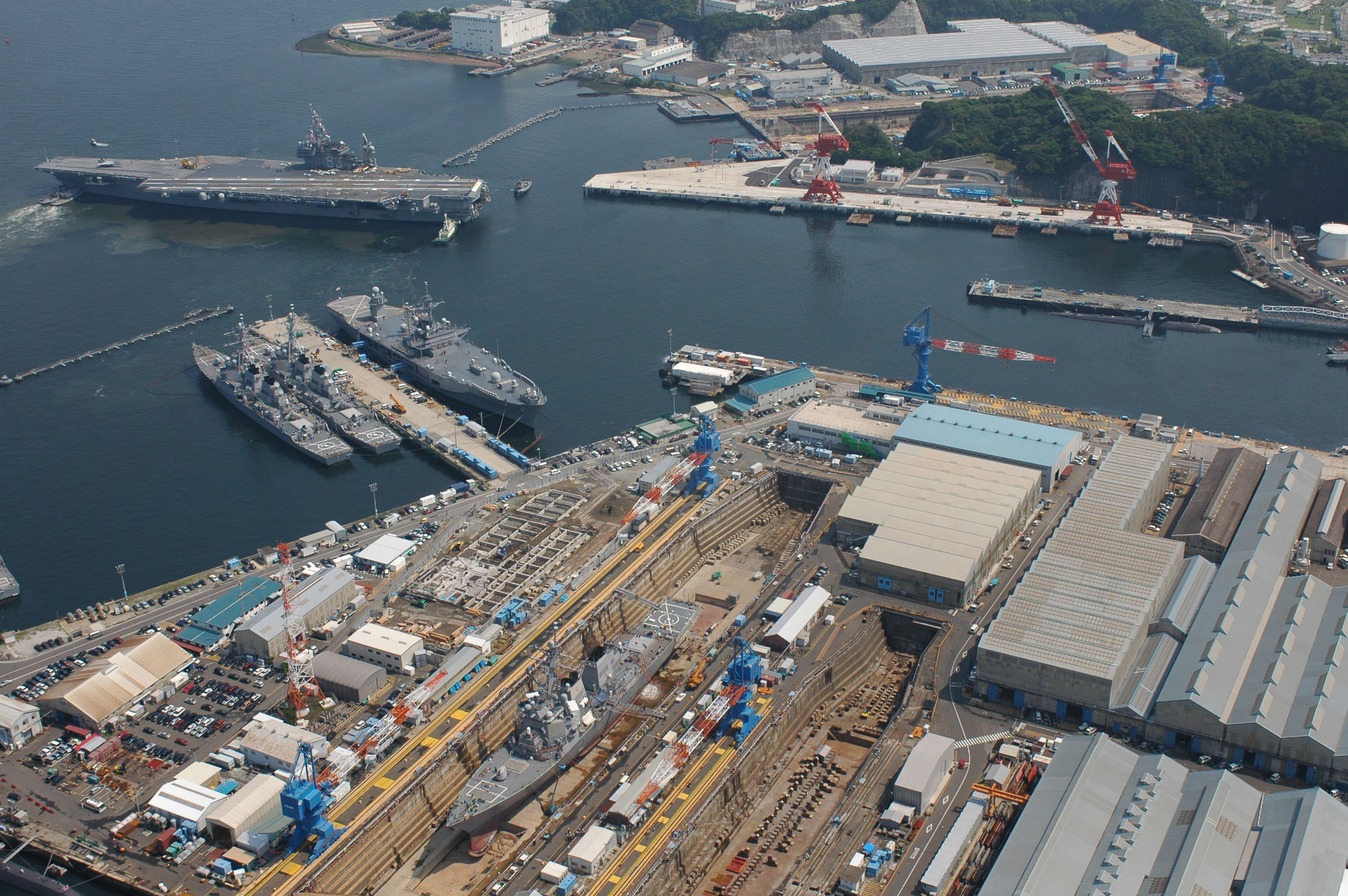
USS Kitty Hawk (CV-63) docks at the U.S. Navy base in Yokosuka, Japan.

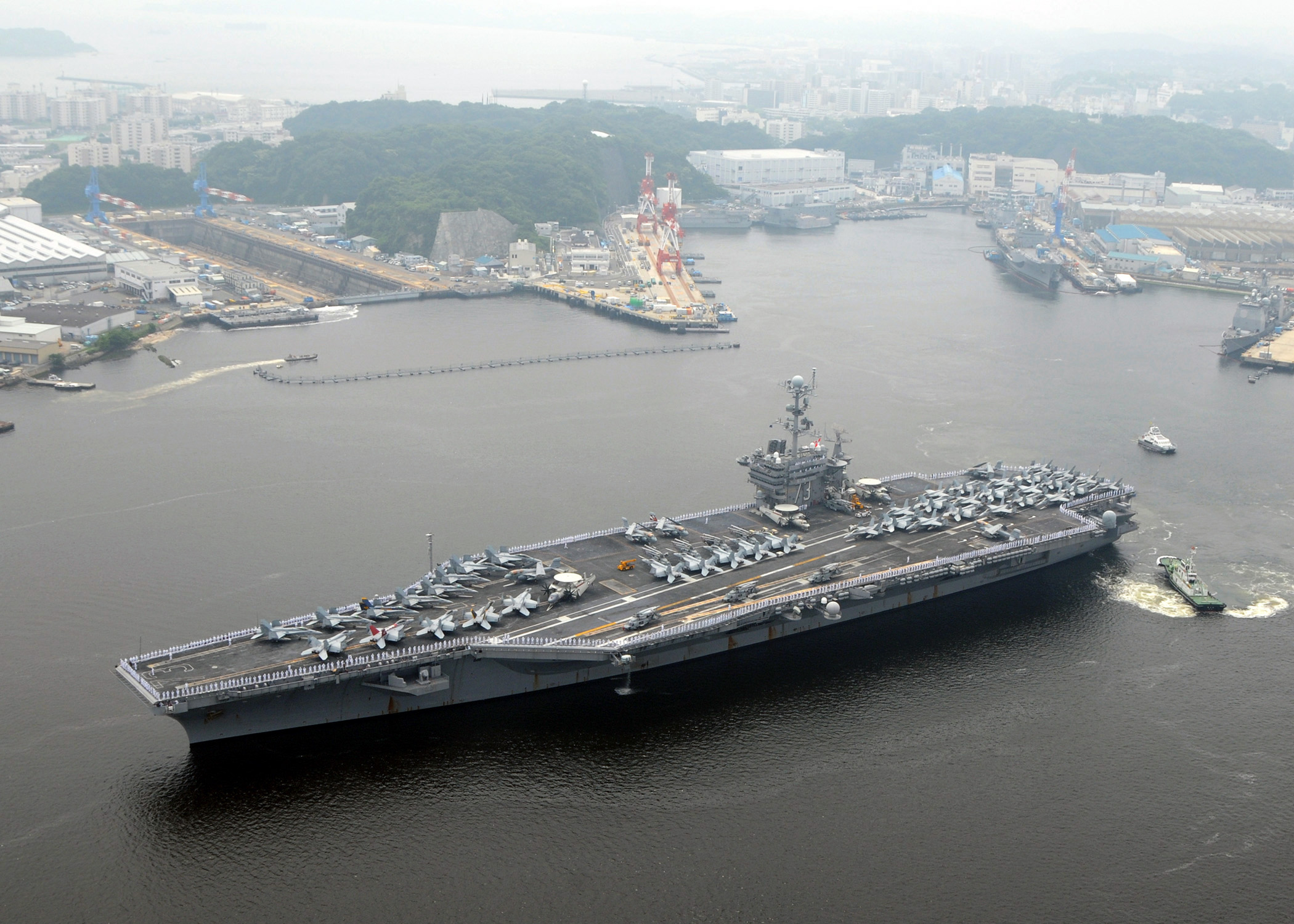
The U.S. Navy base at Yokosuka, with USS George Washington (CVN-73)

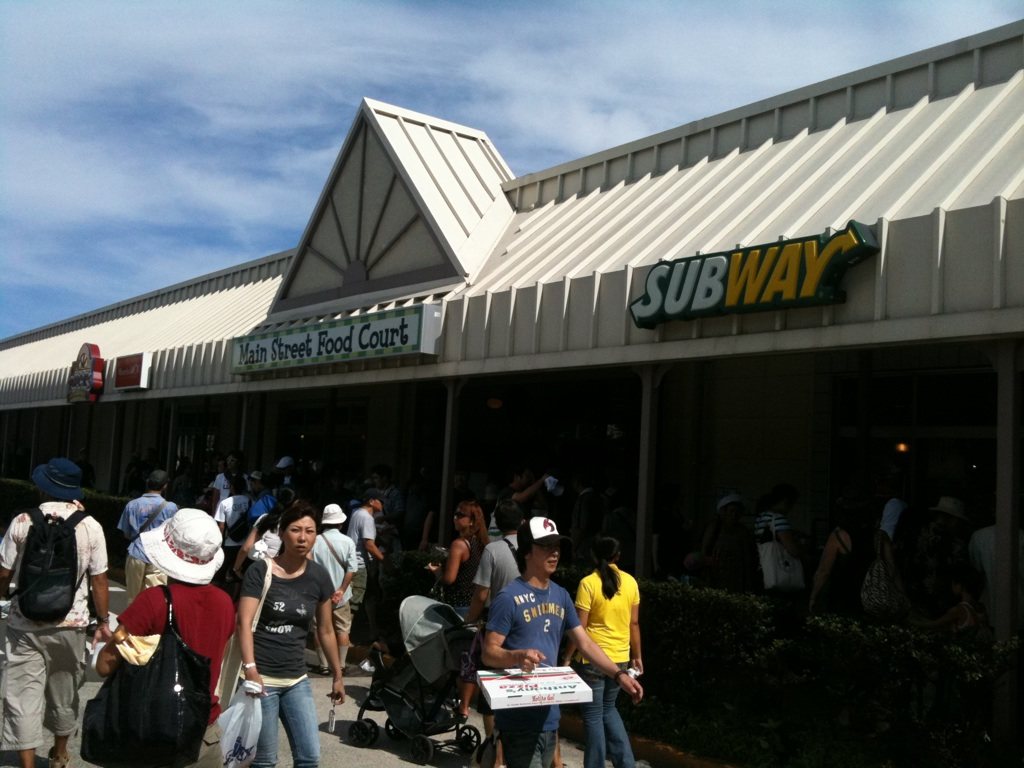
Main street food court

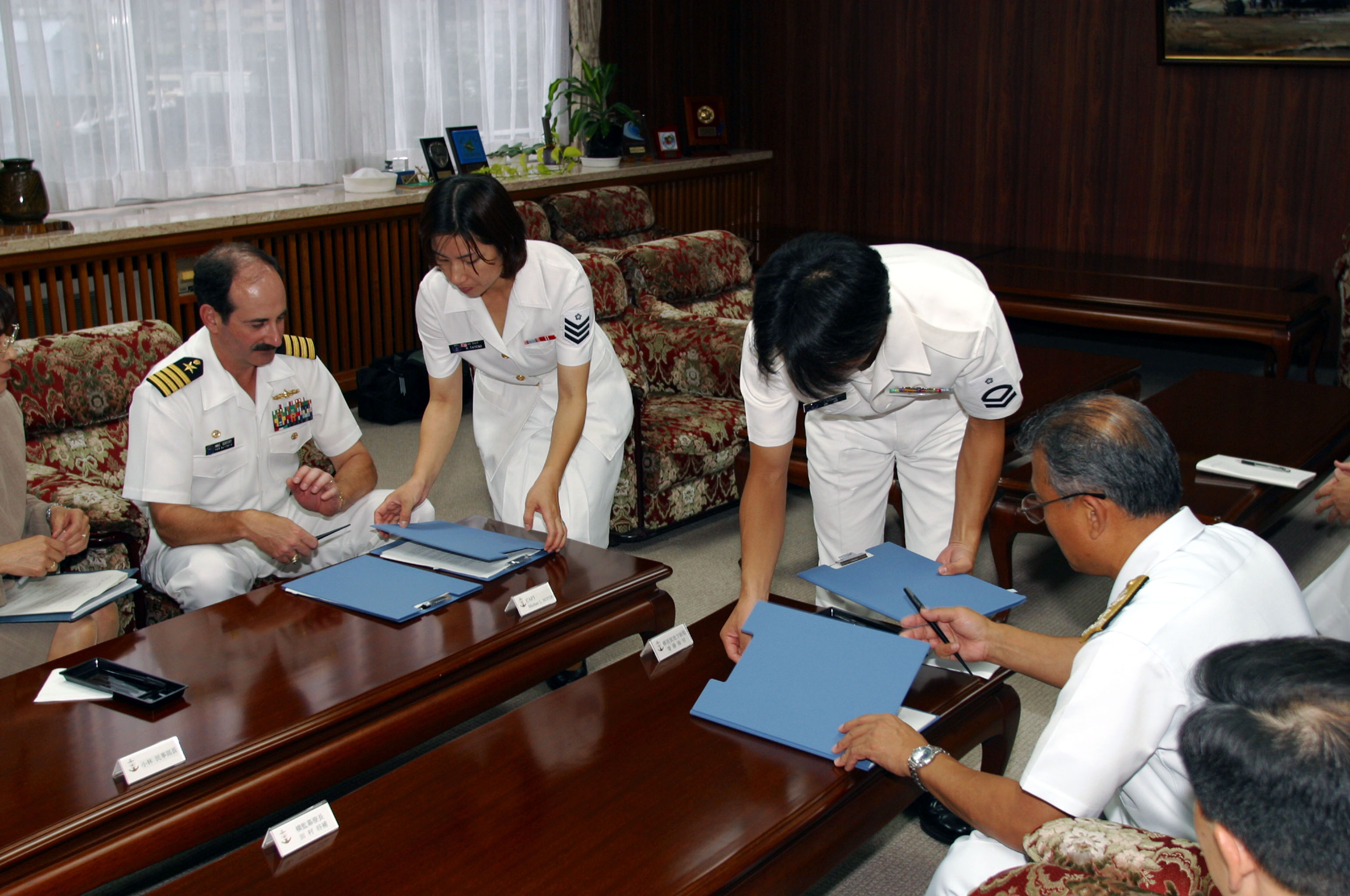
Yokosuka, Japan (23 June 2003) – Vice Adm. Takashi Saito, Commandant, Yokosuka District Japanese Maritime Self-Defense Forces (JMSDF), and Capt. Michael Seifert, Commanding Officer, Fleet Activities Yokosuka, sign a Memorandum of Understanding (MOU) at the JMSDF Commandant Yokosuka District Headquarters. The MOU provides a framework under which the two maritime forces will conduct force protection exercises in Yokosuka.

On 30 August 1945, Vice Admiral Michitaro Tozuka, last Japanese commander of the Yokosuka Naval District, surrendered his command to Rear Admiral Robert Carney, and the base was peacefully occupied by U.S. Marines of the 6th Marine Division, British Royal Marines, and U.S. Naval personnel. Commander Fleet Activities (COMFLEACT) Yokosuka was created shortly after the occupation in 1945.

As the Base became organized, the shipyard was deactivated and much of the equipment was sent to other countries as part of reparations. The repair ship Piedmont took charge of ship repair and maintenance, the hospital became a Naval Dispensary, later Naval Hospital Yokosuka Japan, and the Supply Department was organized to provide support to the fleet and shore-based activities. The Public Works Department was established. Yokosuka Submarine Base was founded in September 1945.

In May 1946, the Marines at Yokosuka were redesignated Marine Barracks, U.S. Fleet Activities, Yokosuka. In April 1947, the Ship Repair Department was organized, and the shops and dry docks were reactivated to maintain the ships of the U.S. Fleet in the Pacific. With the onset of the Korean War on 25 June 1950, Yokosuka Navy Base suddenly became very important and extremely busy.

The U.S., still an occupying power in Japan, turned its full efforts to the support of South Korea. The Navy Dispensary was enlarged and expanded and was commissioned a U.S. Naval Hospital in 1950. The Naval Communications Facility, Yokosuka, was commissioned in January 1951. In April 1951, the Ship Repair Department became a component command. It was redesignated the Ship Repair Facility. As the major naval ship repair facility in the Far East, the Yokosuka Facility assumed a vital role in maintenance and repair of the U.S. Seventh Fleet during both the Korean War and Vietnam War.

In March 1952, the geographical boundaries of Naval Forces Far East were changed to exclude the Philippines, Marianas, Bonin and Volcano Islands. In December 1952, the headquarters were shifted from Tokyo to Yokosuka. The expanded Supply Department of Fleet Activities became Naval Supply Depot, Yokosuka in August 1952. In 1960, the Naval Communications Facility was redesignated U.S. Naval Communications Station, Japan.

In 1952, US occupation of Japan formally ended and Japanese rearmament commenced, with its naval forces formally organized as Japan Maritime Self Defense Force by 1954. Some parts of the former Yokosuka Naval District were ceded back to house a new base for JMSDF, now known as JMSDF Yokosuka Naval Base.

On 5 October 1973, USS Midway, with Carrier Air Wing Five and her accompanying task group, put into Yokosuka, marking the first forward deployment of a complete carrier task group in a Japanese port. This was the result of an accord reached on 31 August 1972 between the U.S. and Japan. In addition to the morale factor of dependents housed along with the crew in a foreign port, the move had strategic significance because it facilitated the continuous positioning of three carriers in the Far East at a time when the economic situation demanded the reduction of carriers in the fleet.

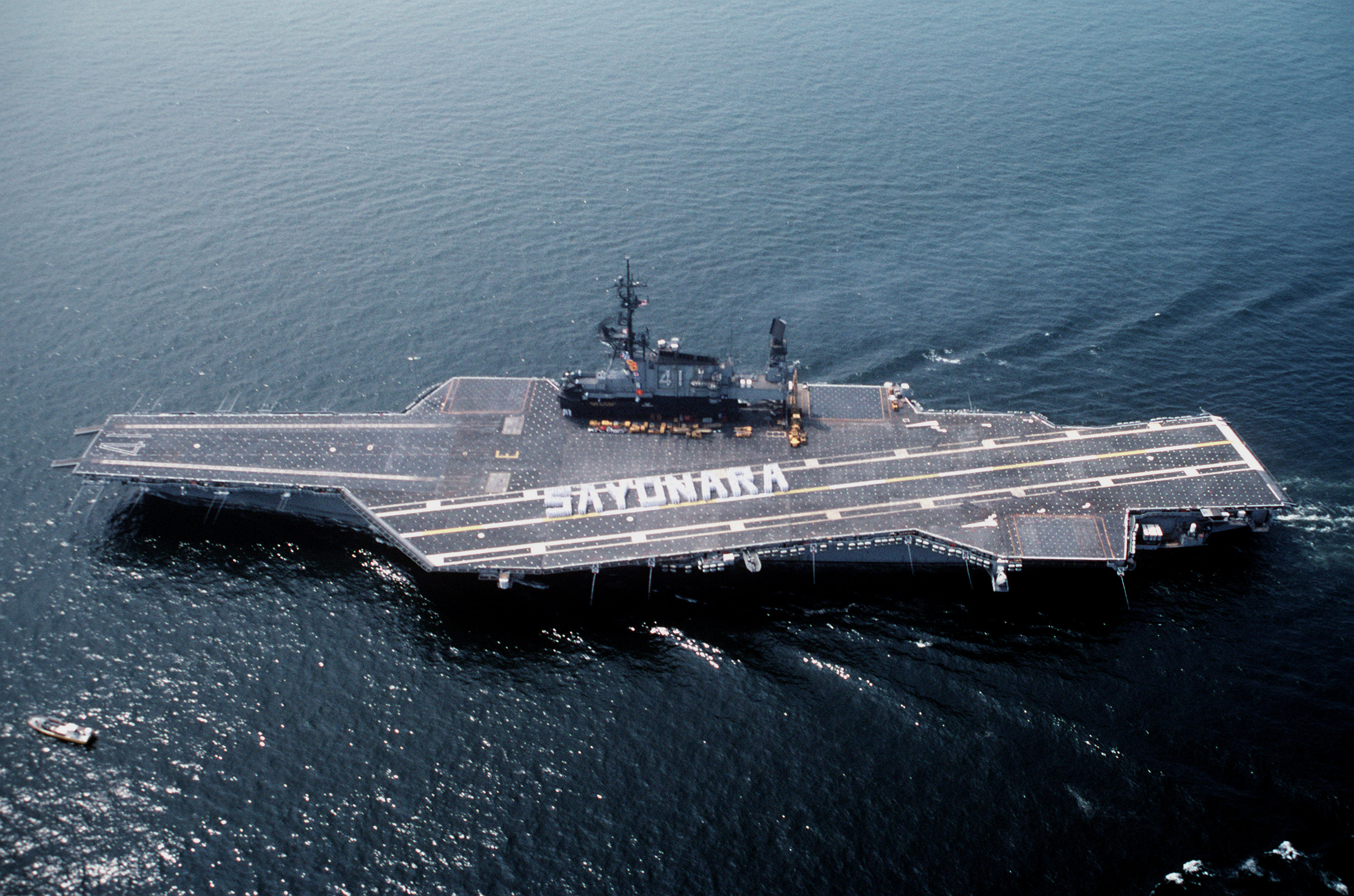
USS Midway departs Yokosuka for the last time in August 1991, having spent eighteen years homeported in Japan

In August 1991, Midway departed Yokosuka and was replaced by Independence as the forward-deployed carrier in Yokosuka. In August 1998, Kitty Hawk relieved Independence as the 7th Fleet forward-based carrier.

On 1 December 2005, the U.S. Navy announced that in 2008 Kitty Hawk would be replaced by the nuclear-powered Nimitz-class aircraft carrier George Washington. A U.S. Navy spokesman said the decision was a mutual agreement between the United States and Japan. Hiroyuki Hosoda, spokesman for Japan's government, said, "We believe that the change (of the carriers) will lead to maintaining the solid presence of the U.S. Navy and contribute to keeping Japan's security and international peace into the future." On 25 September 2008, George Washington arrived in Yokosuka, making it the only forward-deployed, nuclear-powered aircraft carrier in the U.S. Navy.

In recent years, a number of high-profile international incidents involving U.S. sailors occurred around the base. The most notable were two murders which occurred in 2006 and 2008. The latter was a murder committed by seaman Olantunbosun Ugbogu, a Nigerian citizen who had joined the U.S. Navy, but had not yet received citizenship. Ugbogu stabbed a taxi driver to death in order to avoid paying a $200 fare, which he had incurred returning from Tokyo. He had been stationed aboard the guided missile cruiser USS Cowpens (CG-63), but was absent without leave at the time of the murder and considered a deserter. Both murders resulted in the U.S. Navy severely restricting the liberty of all sailors in the fleet.

Personnel and ships from the base assisted with Operation Tomodachi following and during the March 2011 Tōhoku earthquake and tsunami and Fukushima I nuclear accidents. During the crisis, around 3,000 U.S. family members left the base, preferring to be outside Japan during a time of uncertainty.

== Forward-deployed ships ==
=== Command ship ===
- USS Blue Ridge (LCC-19) – flagship, United States Seventh Fleet. [1979 – Present]

=== Aircraft carrier ===
- USS George Washington (CVN-73) – flagship, Carrier Strike Group Five

=== Destroyers ===
Destroyer Squadron 15 (COMDESRON 15)

- USS Milius (DDG-69)
- USS Higgins (DDG-76)
- USS Howard (DDG-83)
- USS McCampbell (DDG-85)
- USS Shoup (DDG-86)
- USS Preble (DDG-88)
- USS Mustin (DDG-89)
- USS Dewey (DDG-105)
- USS John Finn (DDG-113)
- USS Ralph Johnson (DDG-114)
- USS Rafael Peralta (DDG-115)

== Ships formerly forward-deployed ==
- USS Vandegrift (FFG-48) 1998 - 2006
- USS Gary (FFG-51) 1999 -2007
- USS Mobile Bay (CG-53) 1990 - 2003
- USS Cowpens (CG-63) 2000 - 2013
- USS George Washington (CVN-73) 2008 – 2015
- USS Kitty Hawk (CV-63) 1998 - 2008
- USS Independence (CV-62) 1991 - 1998
- USS Vincennes (CG-49) 1997 – 2005
- USS Hewitt (DD-966) 1990-1997
- USS McClusky (FFG-41) 1990 – 1996
- USS O'Brien (DD-975) August 1992 – 2004
- USS Cushing (DD-985) March 1998 – 2005
- USS Fife (DD-991) 1988 - 1998
- USS Knox (FF-1052) August 1977 – July 1988
- USS Lockwood (FF-1064) May 1975 – July 1988
- USS Midway (CV-41) 1973 – 1991
- USS Rodney M. Davis (FFG 60) March 1988–? 1995
- USS Reeves (DLG-24) 1980 - 1991
- USS Bunker Hill (CG-52) August 1988 – July 1998
- USS Towers (DDG-9) October 1980 – October 1990
- USS Cochrane (DDG-21) 1983 – October 1990
- USS White Plains (AFS-4)
- USS Parsons (DDG-33)
- USS Henry W. Tucker (DD-875) 1968 – August 1970
- USS Rupertus (DD-851) 1968 – August 1970
- USS Mahopac (ATA-196)
- USS Francis Hammond (FF-1067)
- USS Oklahoma City (CG-5)
- USS Worden (CG-18)
- USS Waddell (DDG-24)
- USS Oldendorf (DD-972) 1984 - 1995
- USS Rowan (DD-782)
- USS Thach (FFG-43)
- USS Bausell (DD-845)
- USS Richard B. Anderson (DD-786)
- USS Castor (AKS-1) 1954–1968
- USS Curts (FFG-38) 1988 - 1997
- USS Kirk (FF-1087)
- USS Lassen (DDG-82) 2005 - 2016
- USS Fitzgerald (DDG-62) 2004 - 2019
- USS Curtis Wilbur (DDG-54) 1996 - 2021
- USS McCampbell (DDG-85) 2007 - 2020
- USS Gurke (DD-783)
- USS Stethem (DDG-63) 2005 - 2019
- USS Carronade (IFS-1)
- USS White River (LSM(R)-536)
- USS Clarion River (LSM(R)-409)
- USS St. Francis River (LSM(R)-525)
- USS John S. McCain (DDG-56) 1997 – 2021
- USS Mustin (DDG-89) 2006 - 2021
- USS Barry (DDG-52) 2016 - 2023
- USS Ronald Reagan (CVN-76) 2015 - 2024
- USS Benfold (DDG-65)

2015-2025

- USS Robert Smalls (CG-62)

1998-2026

== Landmarks ==
During the late 1960s and 1970s, the Yokosuka Microwave Communications Site was part of the telephone communications network in the Tokyo area. The building and 106.7-meter-tall (350 ft) microwave tower were on the highest hill on the U.S. Navy base.

Komatsu, a historic restaurant near the naval base, became famous for serving Japanese navy personnel before 1945 and the U.S. Navy after. It was destroyed by fire in 2016.

== Education ==
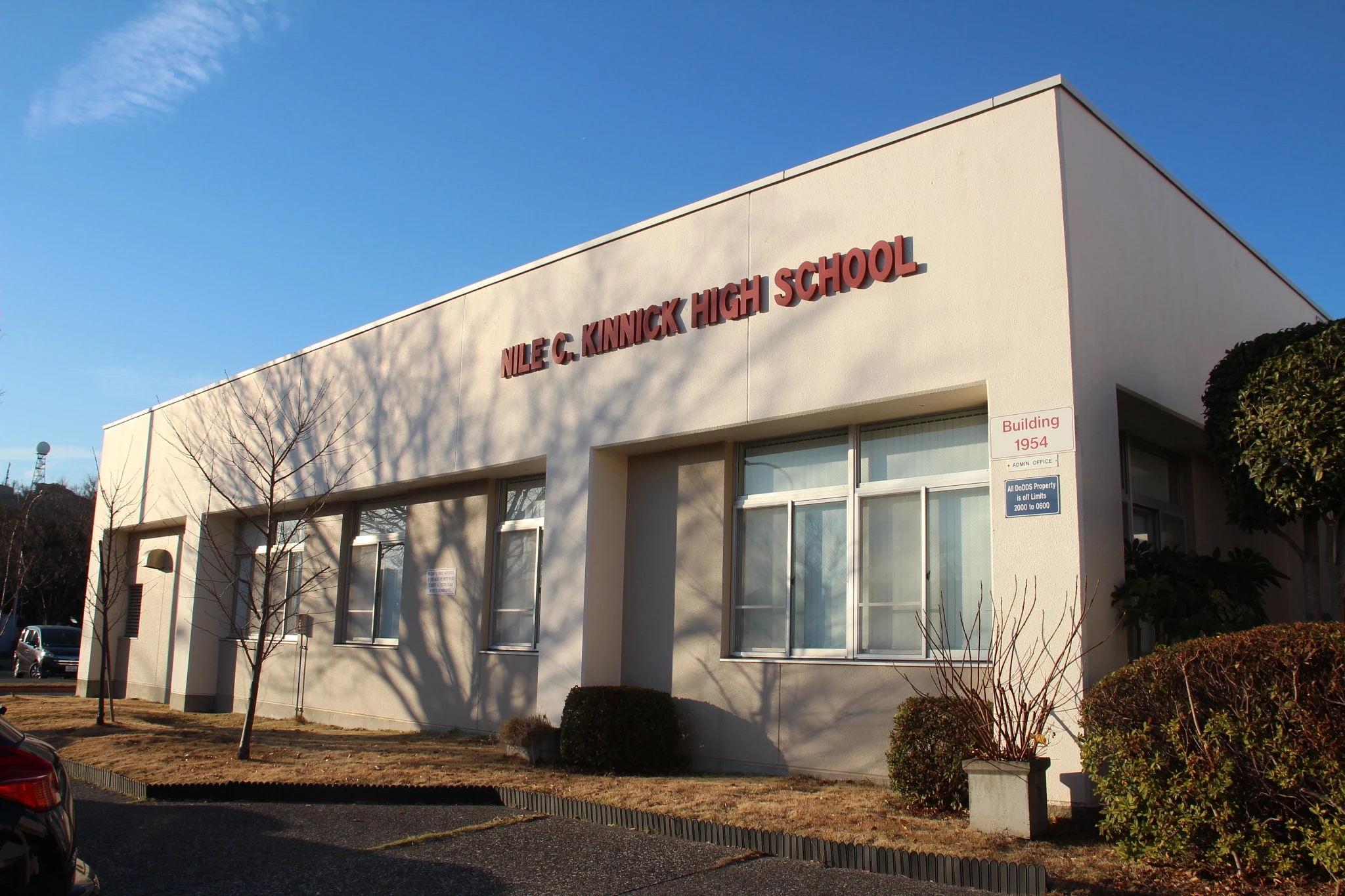
Nile C. Kinnick High School

Department of Defense Education Activity (DoDEA) schools include:

- Nile C. Kinnick High School
- Yokosuka Middle School
- Sullivans Elementary School

Ikego Elementary School is located in the Ikego Housing Area.

== See also ==
- United States Fleet Activities Sasebo
