= Greek ship Kountouriotis =

At least three ships of the Hellenic Navy have borne the name Kountouriotis (Greek: Κουντουριώτης) after Greek naval hero Pavlos Kountouriotis:

- Greek destroyer Kountouriotis (1931) a Freccia-class destroyer launched in 1931 and decommissioned in 1946.
- Greek destroyer Kountouriotis (D213) a Gearing-class destroyer launched in 1945 as USS Rupertus she was transferred to Greece in 1973 and renamed. She was stricken in 1995.
- Greek frigate Kountouriotis (F-462), an Elli-class frigate launched in 1976 as HNLMS Kortenaer she was transferred to Greece in 1997 and renamed.
