= USS Clarion River =

1945 LSM(R)-401 Class Landing Ship Medium (Rocket)

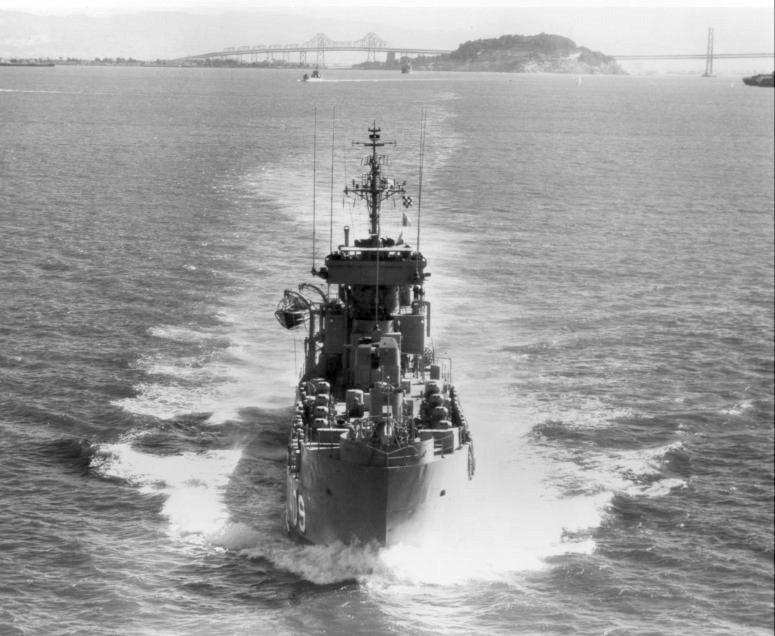
- Clarion River sailing through the San Francisco Bay

History

United States
- Name: USS Clarion River (LSM(R)-409)
- Namesake: Clarion River in Pennsylvania
- Builder: Charleston Navy Yard
- Laid down: 26 January 1945
- Launched: 18 February 1945
- Commissioned: 16 May 1945, as USS LSM(R)-409
- Decommissioned: 6 February 1947
- Recommissioned: 5 October 1950
- Decommissioned: 26 October 1955
- Renamed: USS Clarion River, 1 October 1955
- Recommissioned: 18 September 1965
- Decommissioned: 8 May 1970
- Reclassified: LFR-409 (Inshore Fire Support Ship), 1 January 1969
- Honors and awards: 4 battle stars (Korea); 9 campaign stars (Vietnam)
- Fate: Sold for scrap, November 1970

General characteristics
- Class & type: LSM(R)-401-class landing ship medium
- Displacement: 758 long tons (770 t) light; 993 long tons (1,009 t) attack; 1,175 long tons (1,194 t) full
- Length: 203 ft 6 in (62.03 m)
- Beam: 34 ft 6 in (10.52 m)
- Draft: 7 ft (2.1 m) forward; 9 ft (2.7 m) aft
- Propulsion: 2 × General Motors 16-287A, non-reversing with airflex clutch, diesel engines, direct drive, 2 screws
- Speed: 13 knots (24 km/h; 15 mph)
- Complement: 6 officers, 137 enlisted
- Armament: 1 × single 5"/38 caliber gun; 2 × twin 40 mm AA guns; 4 × twin 20 mm AA guns (after Korea); 4 × 4.2 in (110 mm) mortars (removed after Korea); 10 × twin-tube continuous loading 5 in (130 mm) spin stabilizer rocket launchers (two removed after Korea); 2 × .50 cal (12.7 mm) machine guns on the forecastle; 2 × .30 cal machine guns on the bridge wings

USS Clarion River (LSM(R)-409) was an LSM(R)-401-class medium-type landing ship (LSM) built for the United States Navy during World War II. Named for the Clarion River in west central Pennsylvania, she was the only US Naval vessel to bear the name.

== Service history ==
=== World War II ===
The ship was originally laid down on 26 January 1945 at the Charleston Navy Yard. Launched on 18 February 1945 and commissioned as USS LSM(R)-409 on 16 May 1945.

She was decommissioned on 6 February 1947 at San Diego, California and laid up in the Pacific Reserve Fleet.

=== Korean War ===
LSM(R)-409 was recommissioned on 5 October 1950 for Korean War service. She was assigned to LSMR Squadron Five and participated in the following campaigns:

- Blockade of Wonsan (1951–1953)
- Communist China Spring Offensive (23 May–6 June 1951)
- UN Summer-Fall Offensive (15–30 July 1951 and 26 August–21 September 1951)
- Third Korean Winter (16–30 April 1953)
- Korean Summer-Fall (1 May–20 July 1953)

During her Korean War service, enemy aircraft attacked her in 1953, but did not damage her.

Renamed USS Clarion River (LSM(R)-409) on 1 October 1955, the ship was again decommissioned on 26 October of that year at Astoria, Oregon and laid up in the Pacific Reserve Fleet, Columbia River Group.

=== Vietnam ===
Clarion River was recommissioned on 18 September 1965 at the San Francisco Naval Shipyard, Hunters Point. Reclassified as an "Inshore Fire Support Ship" USS Clarion River (LFR-409) on 1 January 1969, she participated in the following campaigns:

- Vietnamese Counteroffensive (26 May–4 June 1966 and 13–30 June 1966)
- Vietnamese Counteroffensive - Phase II (1–2 July, 13 July–4 August, 13–29 October, 12–23 November 1966 and 30 January–13 March 1967)
- Vietnamese Counteroffensive - Phase III (7 June–6 July, 23 July–17 August, and 26 October–20 November 1967 and 26 December 1967–18 January 1968)
- Tet Counteroffensive (3–25 February 1968)
- Vietnamese Counteroffensive - Phase V (8 July–13 August and 24 August–23 September 1968)
- Vietnamese Counteroffensive - Phase VI (3 November–7 December 1968)
- Tet 69/Counteroffensive (23 February–8 June 1969)
- Vietnam Summer-Fall 1969 (9 June–31 October 1969)
- Vietnam Winter-Spring 1970 (1 November 1969–30 April 1970)

Decommissioned for the last time on 8 May 1970 at Yokosuka, Japan and struck from the Naval Vessel Register (date unknown), she was sold for scrap in November 1970 to the Nissho-Iwai American Corporation of Sasebo, Japan.

== Awards ==
- Navy Unit Citation
- Meritorious Unit Commendation
- Combat Action Ribbon with gold star
- World War II Victory Medal
- National Defense Service Medal with star
- Korean Service Medal with four battle stars
- Vietnam Service Medal with nine campaign stars
- Korean Presidential Unit Citation
- Republic of Vietnam Gallantry Cross
- United Nations Korea Medal
- Korean War Service Medal
- Republic of Vietnam Campaign Medal

== Image gallery ==
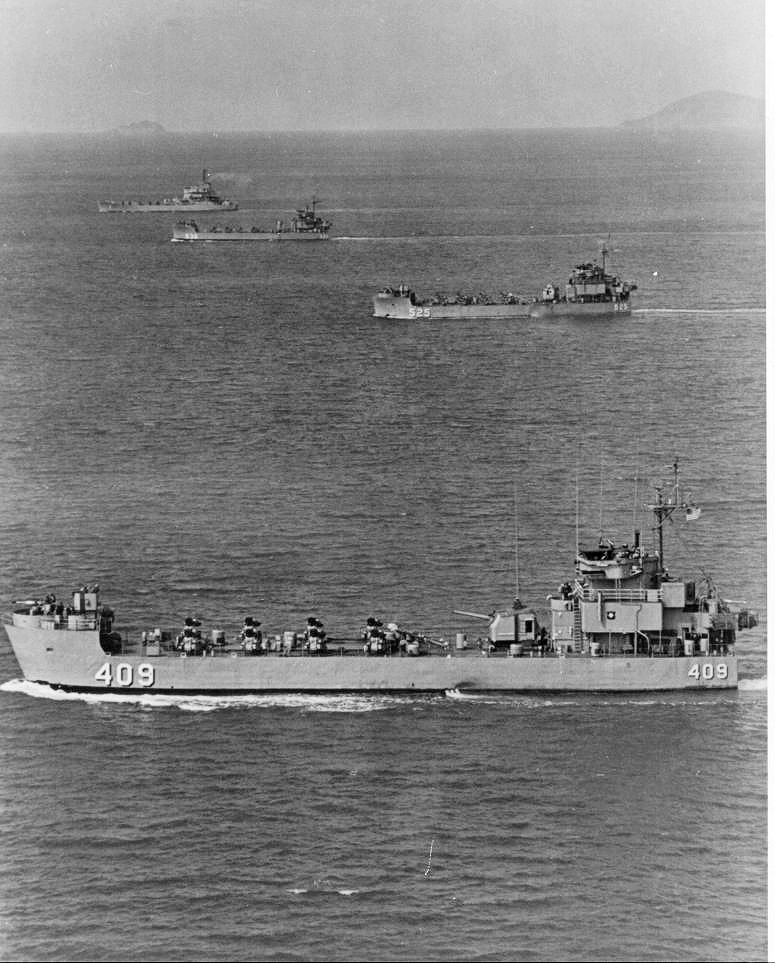
USS Clarion River (LSM(R)-409) with the USS Carronade (IFS-1), USS White River (LSM(R)-536), and USS St. Francis River (LSM(R)-525) off Danang, South Vietnam in November 1967.

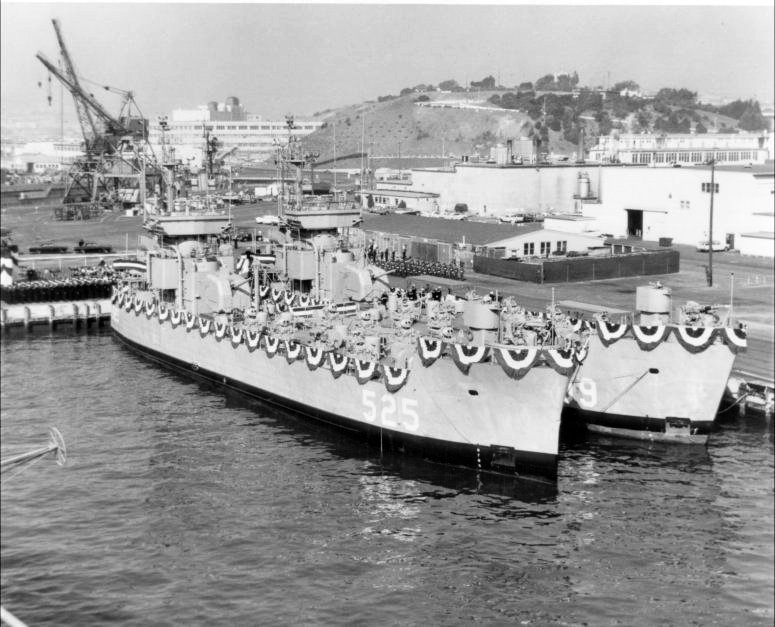
USS Clarion River (LSM(R)-409) and the USS St. Francis River LSM(R)-525 recommissioning ceremony, on 18 September 1965, at the San Francisco Naval Shipyard, Hunters Point.

== See also ==
- List of United States Navy LSMs
