= USS Rupertus =

Gearing-class destroyer

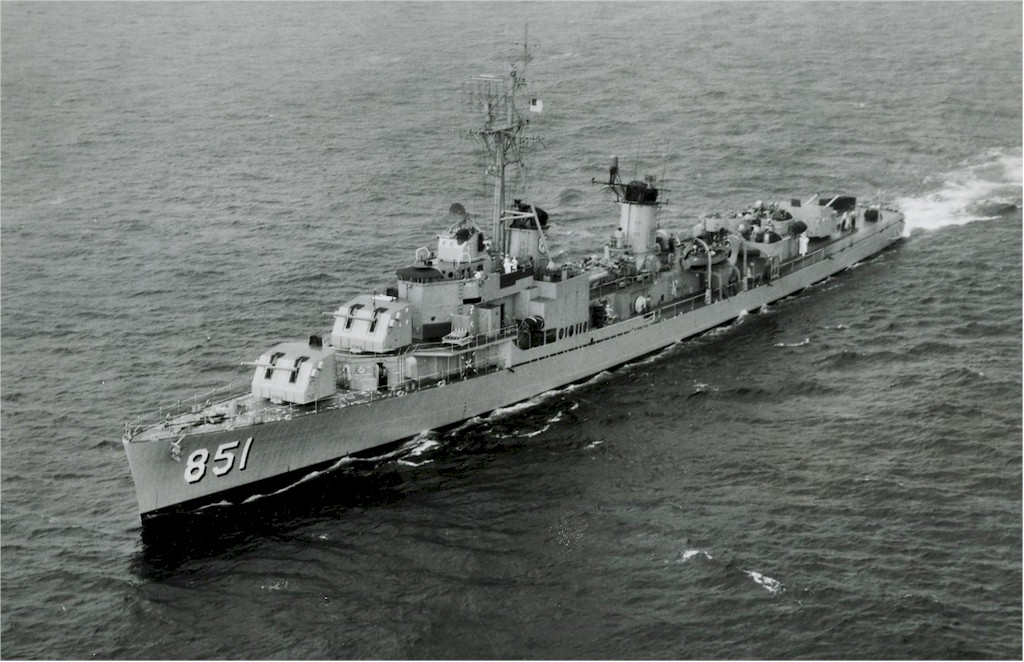
- USS Rupertus in 1958

History

United States
- Name: USS Rupertus
- Namesake: William H. Rupertus
- Builder: Bethlehem Shipbuilding Corporation's Fore River Shipyard in Quincy, Massachusetts
- Laid down: 2 May 1945
- Launched: 21 September 1945
- Commissioned: 8 March 1946
- Decommissioned: 10 July 1973
- Stricken: 10 July 1973
- Identification: Callsign: NBDJ; Hull number: DD-851
- Honors and awards: 7 battle stars (Korea)
- Fate: Loaned to Greece, 10 July 1973

Greece
- Name: Kountouriotis
- Namesake: Pavlos Kountouriotis
- Acquired: 10 July 1973
- Decommissioned: 1994
- Stricken: 1995
- Identification: D213
- Status: laid up

General characteristics
- Class & type: Gearing-class destroyer
- Displacement: 3,460 long tons (3,516 t) full
- Length: 390 ft 6 in (119.02 m)
- Beam: 40 ft 10 in (12.45 m)
- Draft: 14 ft 4 in (4.37 m)
- Propulsion: Geared turbines, 2 shafts, 60,000 shp (44,742 kW)
- Speed: 35 knots (65 km/h; 40 mph)
- Range: 4,500 nmi (8,300 km) at 20 kn (37 km/h; 23 mph)
- Complement: 336
- Armament: 6 × 5 in (127 mm)/38 cal. guns; 12 × 40 mm AA guns; 11 × 20 mm AA guns; 10 × 21 inch (533 mm) torpedo tubes; 6 × depth charge projectors; 2 × depth charge tracks

USS Rupertus (DD-851) was a Gearing-class destroyer of the United States Navy, named for United States Marine Corps Major General William H. Rupertus (1889–1945).

Rupertus (DD-851) was laid down on 2 May 1945 by Bethlehem Steel Co., Quincy, Massachusetts; launched on 21 September 1945; sponsored by Mrs. William H. Rupertus; and commissioned on 8 March 1946.

== Service history ==
=== 1946–1949 ===
Following shakedown off Guantanamo Bay and visits to various east coast ports, Rupertus transited the Panama Canal and steamed to San Francisco. From 1946 she alternated deployments to the western Pacific with operations off the west coast of the United States.

On her first deployment in 1947 she operated throughout the Far East, but particularly at Tsingtao, China. In the eastern Pacific throughout 1948, she returned to Tsingtao in 1949 only to be one of the last three American ships to leave that port before it fell to the Communists.

=== 1950–1959 ===
Returning to San Diego in December for operations in the eastern Pacific and overhaul, she departed San Diego on 13 November 1950 to operate with United Nations Command forces fighting the Korean War. She escorted the aircraft carrier Sicily from Sasebo, Japan to Hŭngnam, Korea; then, from 14 May 1951, operated with blockade and escort Task Force 95 (TF 95) off the west coast of Korea and in the Yellow Sea. Leaving TF 95 and steaming to Wonsan, Rupertus spent ten days off the coast near Songju and fired thousands of rounds of ammunition at shore targets. Rupertus saw continuous combat service until 4 July 1951, when she returned to Inchon during the armistice talks.

Returning to San Diego on 8 August 1951, Rupertus steamed out again to rejoin the 7th Fleet on 23 February 1952. Operating first with carrier TF 77, she then departed to bombard the Hŭngnam-Hannum area with the cruiser Manchester and rescued a pilot from the carrier Boxer while under heavy enemy shore battery fire. Rupertus put into the Long Beach Naval Shipyard for overhaul on 6 October.

Departing San Diego for the western Pacific again on 16 May 1953, Rupertus screened the cruiser Bremerton in TF 77, participated in shore bombardment missions off Korea, conducted hunter-killer exercises, trained Chinese Nationalist naval students in Formosan waters, and participated in the centennial celebration of Commodore Matthew C. Perry's first visit to Japan, before returning to San Diego.

=== 1960–1969 ===
After the Korean Armistice Agreement of July 1953, Rupertus continued her annual deployments to WestPac until 1960 when she was assigned Yokosuka as a homeport. In WestPac for almost three consecutive years, she operated off Vietnam during the Communist advance there in April 1961.

Rupertus returned to San Francisco on 13 December 1962, and following a FRAM I overhaul, which replaced her World War II armament with a modern integrated anti-submarine warfare (ASW) weapons system including ASROC and QH-50 DASH, she entered her temporary homeport of Long Beach, California. On 26 May 1964 she again steamed for Yokosuka, Taiwan Patrol, and, after the August Gulf of Tonkin incident, the South China Sea. Remaining in the Far East, in June 1965 she participated in operations supporting the Gemini IV space flight; she then returned to Vietnamese waters for "Market Time" operations, boarding and inspecting many boats and ships off South Vietnam in search of Communist contraband; and provided naval gunfire support to U.S. forces in Vietnam. Operations on Taiwan Patrol and in the South China Sea continued throughout 1966, interrupted by participation in Gemini IX-A recovery operations in May and June.

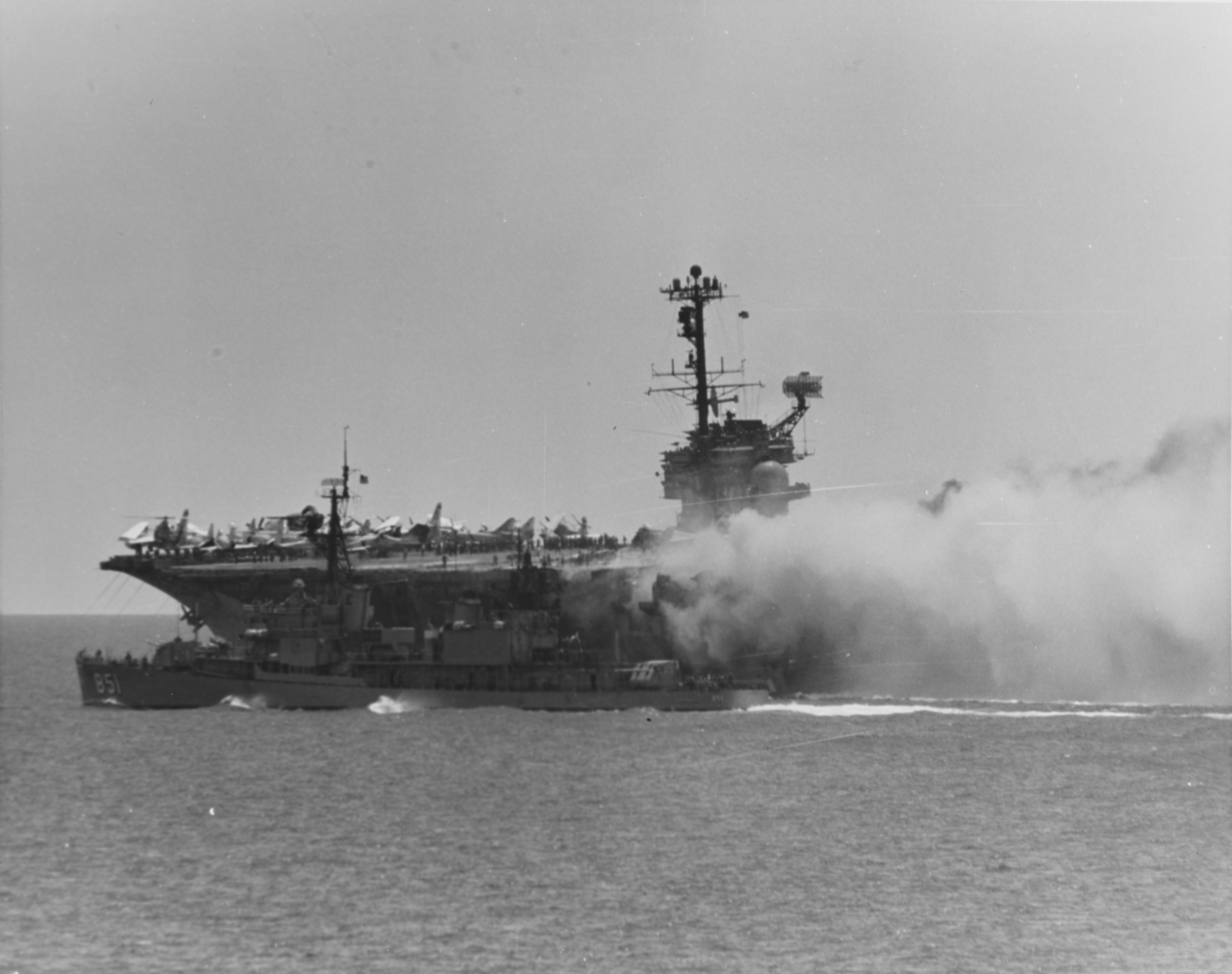
Rupertus assists in fighting fire aboard the carrier Forrestal on 29 July 1967 off Vietnam.

Rupertus, again homeported at Long Beach, arrived there on 3 August 1966. A year later, she sailed for the Far East again, arriving on "Yankee Station" in the Gulf of Tonkin in July. With Forrestal when a series of explosions temporarily disabled the carrier on 29 July, Rupertus maneuvered to within 20 ft (6.1 m) of the crippled ship and remained alongside for a period of three hours, assisting in fighting fires, cooling magazines, and rescuing personnel thrown into the sea. Rupertus then participated in "Sea Dragon" operations, involving the interdiction of waterborne logistics craft staging from North Vietnamese ports, and drew enemy fire off Đồng Hới, North Vietnam, which resulted in minor shrapnel hits. Assigned to gunfire support off South Vietnam in October, she returned to Long Beach on 4 December.

Following overhaul and exercises off the California coast, Rupertus again got underway for WestPac on 3 July 1968. She arrived in her new homeport, Yokosuka, on 22 July, and assumed naval gunfire support responsibilities off South Vietnam on 14 August. Taking up "Sea Dragon" duties on 29 August, she again came under fire from enemy coastal defense sites. After serving as part of the Apollo 7 recovery team, she returned to duties off Vietnam and then plane guard duty off Korea, winding up 1968 in Yokosuka.

Continuing to operate throughout the Far East during 1969, part of that time off Vietnam, Rupertus returned to San Diego on 15 August 1970.

=== 1970–1973 ===
She remained in San Diego for the rest of 1970, spending much of the time in drydock. Both 1971 and 1972 brought Rupertus a WestPac cruise, each of about six months duration and alternated with operations in the San Diego area. Soon after her return from the second of these latest deployments, in the spring of 1973, she underwent an INSURV inspection which resulted in her being declared unfit for further service.

== Greek service ==
Rupertus was offered to the Hellenic Navy on a loan basis and she was decommissioned on 10 July 1973. Concurrent with her decommissioning, she was transferred to the Hellenic Navy and recommissioned as Kountouriotis (D213). She remained in the Greek Navy until retired in 1994. The ship was stricken in 1995, and as of 1998 was laid up in Souda Bay, Crete.

== Awards ==
Rupertus earned seven battle stars for service in the Korean War.

Rupertus was awarded the Combat Action Ribbon during its final west-pac cruise July 1972 - February 1973.
