= Nikolaos Votsis =

Greek naval officer

- Νικόλαος Βότσης
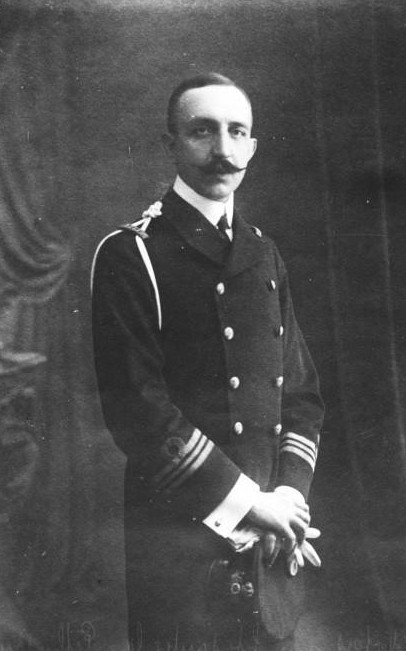
- A photo of Votsis, c. 1913

Greek High Commissioner in Constantinople
- In office 27 January 1921 – 22 February 1922
- Monarch: Constantine I
- Prime Minister: Nikolaos Kalogeropoulos; Dimitrios Gounaris
- Preceded by: Efthimios Kanellopoulos
- Succeeded by: Charalambos Simopoulos

Personal details
- Born: c. 1877 Hydra, Kingdom of Greece
- Died: September 1931 Paris, Third French Republic
- Relations: Georgios Kountouriotis (great-grandfather); Lazaros Kountouriotis (great-great-uncle); Pavlos Kountouriotis (uncle)
- Education: Hellenic Naval Academy
- Awards: Grand Cross is the Order of the Redeemer; Order of Prince Danilo I

Military service
- Allegiance: Kingdom of Greece
- Branch/service: Royal Hellenic Navy
- Years of service: 1900-1922
- Rank: Rear Admiral
- Commands: Torpedo boat No. 11; Kilkis; Lemnos
- Battles/wars: Cretan Revolt of 1897; Balkan Wars; Occupation of Constantinople

Nikolaos Votsis (Greek: Νικόλαος Βότσης; c. 1877–1931) was a Greek naval officer who distinguished himself during the Balkan Wars and rose to the rank of Rear Admiral.

== Life ==
Votsis was born in the island of Hydra in about 1877. He belonged to the prominent Votsis-Kountouriotis family: he was the nephew of admiral Pavlos Kountouriotis, while his maternal great-grandfather was Georgios Kountouriotis, participant of the Greek War of Independence.

During his studies at the Naval Academy, he served in the naval blockade of Crete in 1896–97, in the run-up to the Greco-Turkish War of 1897. He then spent the period 1904-1906 in training service in the French Navy.

At the outbreak of the First Balkan War in October 1912, with the rank of Lieutenant, he was commanding torpedo boat No. 11, a vessel already old at the time (it belonged to a batch of six constructed in Stettin in 1884).

=== Sinking the Feth-i Bülend ===
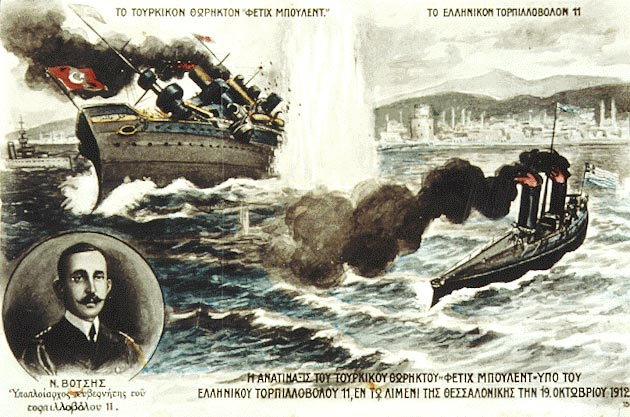
A highly exaggerated depiction of the sinking of the Feth-i Bülend in a popular lithograph. Votsis is shown in the lower left corner.

Setting sail from his base at Litochoro, on the night of 31 October [O.S. 18 October] 1912, Votsis led his vessel into the harbour of Thessaloniki, at the time still held by the Ottomans. Inside the harbour, which was protected by minefields and coastal batteries, lay a handful of Ottoman vessels: aside from four tugboats, the only warship was the old ironclad Feth-i Bülend. The ship had been disarmed and converted into a barracks ship, with its weaponry having been used to reinforce the coastal batteries.

According to Votsis' own description, he evaded the searchlights of Karaburnu fortress which stood at the entrance of the harbour, and sighted the Feth-i Bülend at 23:20. Sailing closer and directly towards the unsuspecting vessel, he launched his starboard torpedo at 23:35 from a distance of 150 m, followed by the portside torpedo. As he turned his ship around, he also launched the deck-mounted torpedo, but it exploded on the quay. While the torpedoes struck the Feth-i Bülend, Votsis sailed out of the harbour at full speed, relying on his craft's shallow draught to pass over the minefield and sailed towards Greek-held territory.

The Feth-i Bülend sank rapidly. Casualties however amounted to only seven men from its crew, as most were ashore manning the guns. The sinking of the Feth-i Bülend may not have had much military significance, but it provided a great morale boost to the Greeks: it was the first of a series of naval successes in the war, and the Hydriot Votsis was propelled to the status of a national hero, readily associated with the legendary fireship captains of the Greek Revolution.

=== Later career ===
Promoted to Lt. Commander, he was placed in command of the captured Ottoman torpedo boat Antalya, which was renamed to Nicopolis.

In 1920, he was captain of the battleship Kilkis at anchor at Constantinople. On 27 January 1921 (O.S.), he was appointed as Greece's High Commissioner to the Allied mission at Constantinople, a post he held until 22 February 1922 (O.S.), when he was appointed captain of the battleship Lemnos, which he commanded until September 1922.

Disagreeing with the revolt of the Army, led by Venizelist officers, against the royalist government, he resigned in October and went into retirement with the rank of Rear Admiral.

From 1927 to his death in 1931 he was the president of the Greco-Albanian Association with Filippos Dragoumis, brother of Ion Dragoumis as secretary.

== Honours ==
- In 1934, a marble bust of Votsis was erected at Thessaloniki, in front of the White Tower.
- A La Combattante IIa-class fast attack craft, the Ypoploiarchos Votsis (P 72) has been named after him.
- Order of Prince Danilo I

== Sources ==
- (in Greek) ΔΙΟΙΚΗΣΗ ΤΑΧΕΩΝ ΣΚΑΦΩΝ - MIA ΠΕΡΙΗΓΗΣΗ ΣΤΗΝ ΙΣΤΟΡΙΑ from the ΠΤΗΣΗ magazine, issue 170, February 1997, pp. 12, 18
