= USS Carronade =

US naval vessel (1953–1970)

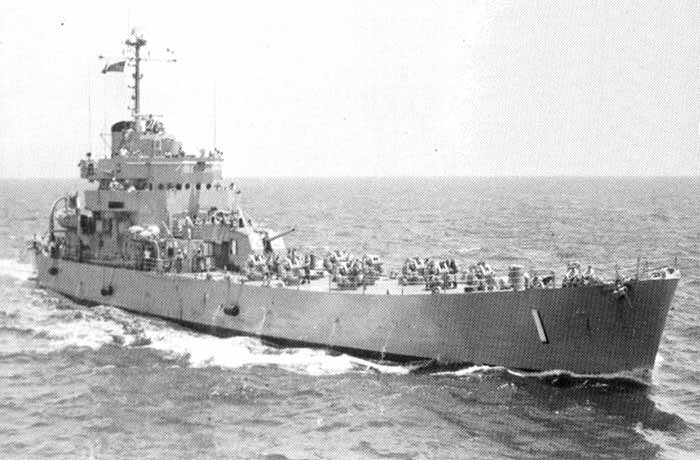
- USS Carronade IFS-1, at sea

History

United States
- Name: USS Carronade
- Namesake: A type of short-barreled cannon
- Builder: Puget Sound Bridge and Dredging Company
- Laid down: 19 November 1952
- Launched: 26 May 1953
- Commissioned: 25 May 1955, and; 1 January 1969
- Decommissioned: 24 July 1970 (final)
- Stricken: 1973
- Identification: IFS-1
- Fate: Scrapped

General characteristics
- Displacement: 1,500 tons
- Length: 245 ft (75 m)
- Beam: 38 ft 6 in (11.73 m)
- Draft: 11 ft (3.4 m)
- Propulsion: Diesel, twin screw, 3,100 shp (2,300 kW)
- Speed: 15 knots (28 km/h; 17 mph)
- Capacity: 162 officers and enlisted
- Armament: 1 × 1 5-inch/38 caliber gun DP mount; 2 × twin 40 mm Bofors; 8 × twin Mark 105 rocket launchers

USS Carronade (IFS-1/LFR-1) was a ship of the United States Navy first commissioned in 1955. She was named after the carronade, a type of short barreled cannon.

As an Inshore Fire Support Ship (IFS), part of the so-called "brown-water navy", Carronade was designed under project SCB 37, and built to provide direct naval gunfire support to amphibious landings or operations close to shore. Carronade was armed with two twin 40 mm anti-aircraft mounts (mounted fore and aft of the superstructure), one dual-purpose 5-inch/38 caliber naval cannon, and eight mk.105 twin automatic rocket launchers. Each launcher was capable of firing thirty spin-stabilized rockets per minute. Carronade was designed to fire rockets with no crew on deck, decreasing risk to crew, and her rockets were controlled by an electronic fire control computer believed to be faster and more accurate than that on her predecessor, the Landing Ship Medium (Rocket). Carronade was also very maneuverable thanks to her variable-pitch propellers and faster than her predecessor, with a top speed of 15–17 knots (17–20 mph).

== History ==
Carronade's keel was laid 19 November 1952, and she was launched 26 May 1953 by Puget Sound Bridge and Dredging Company, Seattle, Washington; sponsored by Mrs. L. Herndon; and commissioned 25 May 1955.

Carronade departed Bremerton for her home port, San Diego, 21 July 1955. She arrived 24 July, and was inspected by Secretary of the Navy C. S. Thomas on 26 July. The first ship of her design, Carronade carried out extensive training in the San Diego area until 19 March 1956 when she sailed to Pearl Harbor for a month of operations. Returning to San Diego for local exercises she made a good-will visit to Vancouver, British Columbia (20 August – 1 September), and then participated in amphibious exercises demonstrating the effectiveness of the inshore fire support ship (November 1956 – January 1957).

Carronade resumed local operations, upkeep and overhaul in the San Diego area until a Far Eastern tour of duty (18 January – 15 July 1958). She returned to the West Coast and local operations the autumn of 1959 when she departed on another cruise to the Orient. Sailing back to San Diego in February 1960, Carronade remained there and was decommissioned and placed in reserve on 31 May 1960.

Carronade was re-commissioned as IFS-1 on 2 October 1965. During the Vietnam War, Carronade served as the flagship of Inshore Fire Support Division 93 (IFSDIV93), working alongside USS Clarion River, USS St. Francis River and USS White River. Shortly before decommissioning, all ships in IFSDIV93 were re-designated as LFR.

Decommissioned again on 24 July 1970, Carronade was stricken from the Naval Vessel Register on 1 May 1973. She was sold for scrap to West Waterway Lumber Co. on 1 September 1974.

== Ship awards ==
Carronade earned ten Battle Stars for her Vietnam War service.

- Combat Action Ribbon
- Navy Unit Commendation with star (2 awards)
- Navy Meritorious Unit Commendation
- National Defense Service Medal
- Vietnam Service Medal with two silver campaign stars (10 awards)
- Republic of Vietnam Gallantry Cross Unit Citation (13 awards)
- Republic of Vietnam Civil Actions Unit Citation
- Republic of Vietnam Campaign Medal
