= Hannum =

Hannum is a surname. Notable people with the surname include:

- Alberta Pierson Hannum (1906–1985), American author
- John Hannum (disambiguation), multiple people
- Thom Hannum (born 1957), percussionist and music educator
- Alex Hannum (1923–2002), American professional basketball player and coach
