= Lazaros Kountouriotis =

Greek Senator (1769–1852)

Lazaros Kountouriotis Λάζαρος Κουντουριώτης
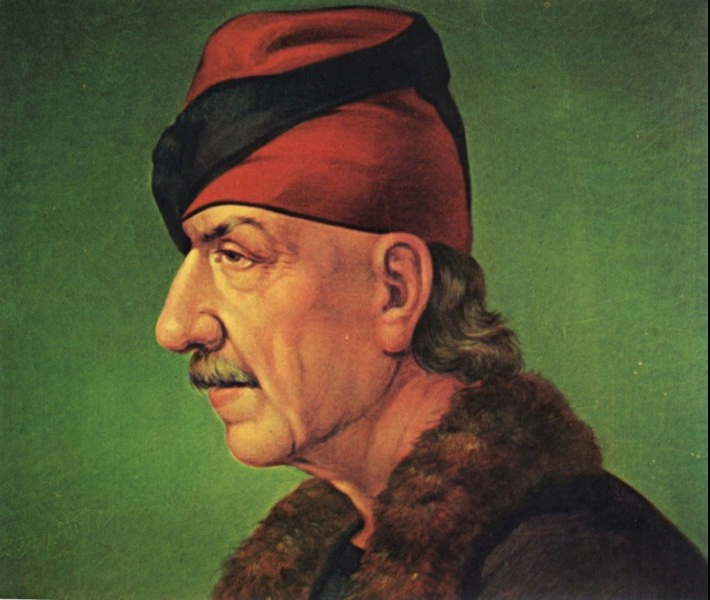
- Lazaros Kountouriotis

Senator
- In office ? – 12 June 1852
- Monarch: Otto
- Prime Minister: Antonios Kriezis

Personal details
- Born: April 1769 Hydra, Ottoman Empire (now Greece)
- Died: 12 June 1852 (aged 83)
- Relations: Georgios Kountouriotis (brother); Pavlos Kountouriotis (great-nephew); Pantelis Horn (great-grandson); Nikolaos Votsis (great-great-nephew); Dimitris Horn (great-great-grandson)
- Awards: Grand Cross of the Order of the Redeemer

Military service
- Allegiance: (Greece) First Hellenic Republic
- Branch/service: Hellenic Navy
- Battles/wars: Greek War of Independence

Lazaros Kountouriotis (Greek: Λάζαρος Κουντουριώτης; April 1769 - 6 July (O.S.) or 12 June 1852) was a Greek Senator of the 1844 Senate and a major figure of the Greek War of Independence.

== Life ==
Lazaros Kountouriotis was born in Hydra in April 1769 to an Arvanite family. The family, apparently the richest in independent Greece, stemmed from the younger son of an Albanian peasant. He settled the island as a boatman after the Venetians left the Peloponnese (1715) but before the island received its permanent colony. The Koundouriotis family used extensively their native Arvanitic dialect of Hydra. After the family moved to Hydra, they adopted the surname "Zervas" which was later dropped when Lazaros' grandfather, Hatzigeorgios Zervas, visited a family friend in the Kountouria region and returned wearing a local to that area dress, adopting the nickname of "Kountouriotis" which eventually replaced the surname. Lazaros' father, Andreas, used the new surname of Kountouriotis and married the daughter of the very influential and rich merchant Lazaros Kokkinis. Lazaros Kountouriotis was the eldest of two children, his younger brother by 13 years was Georgios.

At the age of 14, Lazaros became involved in the commercial activities of his father, representing him in Hydra while the elder Kountouriotis was on business in Genoa. After his father's assassination in 1799, Lazaros continued running the family's interests and grew it substantially.

Although he was not one of the initial instigators of the revolution, which he considered premature, he supported it fully after it began. At the time, his fortune was estimated to be at least 800,000 reals and he spent 3/4s of it for the revolution.

While serving as a Senator and considered as the First Citizen of Greece, he died on 12 June 1852 and a five-day period of national mourning followed.

The playwright Pantelis Horn was Lazaros' great-grandson.
