= USS White River =

1945 LSM(R)-501-class landing ship medium

USS White River (LSM(R)-536)
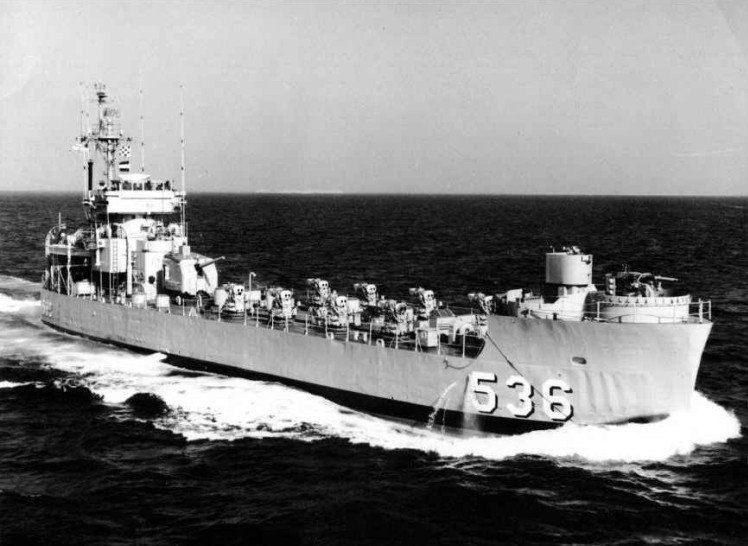
- USS White River (LSMR-536) underway

History

United States
- Name: LSM(R)-525 (28 November 1945 – 1 October 1955); White River (1 October 1955 –)
- Namesake: White River in Arkansas; White River in Colorado; White River in Indiana; White River in South Dakota; White River in Texas; White River in Vermont; White River in Washington
- Builder: Brown Shipbuilding Company
- Laid down: 9 June 1945
- Launched: 14 July 1945
- Commissioned: 28 November 1945
- Decommissioned: 31 July 1946
- Reclassified: LFR-536
- Stricken: 22 May 1970
- Honors and awards: Navy and Meritorious Unit Commendations; Vietnam Service Medal with 10 Battle Stars (2 for Korean War service, 8 for Vietnam service)
- Fate: Sold for scrap in November 1970

General characteristics
- Class & type: LSM(R)-501-class landing ship medium (rocket)
- Displacement: 758 t.(light); 993 t. (attack); 1,175 t. (fully loaded)
- Length: 206 ft 3 in (62.87 m)
- Beam: 34 ft 6 in (10.52 m)
- Draft: 5 ft 4 in (1.63 m) (light); 6 ft 9 in (2.06 m) (attack); 7 ft 9 in (2.36 m) (fully loaded)
- Installed power: 2 × General Motors (non-reversing with airflex clutch) diesels
- Propulsion: Direct drive with two 1,440 bhp (1,070 kW) each at 720rpm, twin screws
- Speed: 13 knots (24 km/h; 15 mph)
- Range: 3,000 mi (2,600 nmi; 4,800 km) at 13 knots (24 km/h; 15 mph)
- Complement: 6 officers, 137 enlisted
- Armament: 1 × 5 in (130 mm) dual purpose gun mount; 2 × twin 40 mm gun mounts; 4 × twin 20 mm gun mounts; 10 × twin continuous loading 5" SS rocket launchers; 4 × 4".2 mortars

USS White River (LSMR-536) (later LFR-536) was a Landing Ship Medium (Rocket) (LSMR) in service with the US Navy between 1945 and 1946, 1950 and 1956, and 1965 and 1970. As a member of the LSM(R)-501-class Landing Ship Medium (Rocket), White River was designed to provide rocket fire support to US and allied amphibious operations, although in South Vietnam she was generally used to bombard enemy formations and installations. She saw combat in the Korean and Vietnam Wars, making a large contribution to the latter, in which she fired tens to hundreds of thousands of rockets in support of American, South Vietnamese, and South Korean operations against the Viet Cong during ten tours of duty in Vietnam, 1966 through 1969. In Navy publications such as All Hands and the Navy Times, as well as in the recollections of crew, forward observers and spotters, and ground forces receiving her support, White River was reported to have the firepower of six destroyers or a cruiser. She could fire 250 65-pound (29 kg) rockets in a minute, plus 5-inch shells and autocannon fire, and carry a magazine of 1,500-2,000 rockets.

White River was named LSMR-536 when she was launched by the Brown Shipbuilding Company in 1945 and during her Korean War service, only acquiring the name White River in 1955 after returning to the United States. She was reclassified as an Inshore Fire Support Ship (LFR) on 14 August 1968, better reflecting her fire support role in Vietnam. She was decommissioned and struck from the Naval Register in 1970 and sold for scrap that same year.

White River was among the ships exposed to the toxic Agent Orange herbicide while docked at port or conducting operations in Vietnam's inland waterways, and any crew who served on White River in Vietnam can be presumed to have been exposed to toxic herbicides without further development according to the Veterans Administration.

== History ==
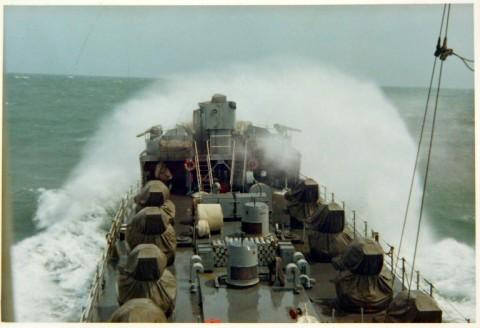
USS White River near Vietnam, showing the pounding the flat-bottomed ship took in high sea states

The unnamed medium landing ship (rocket) LSMR-536 was laid down on 9 June 1945 at Houston, Texas, by the Brown Shipbuilding Company; launched on 14 July 1945; and commissioned on 28 November 1945.

Departing Houston on 3 December 1945, LSMR-536 made a three-day stop at Galveston before continuing on to Charleston, SC, where she completed outfitting. She stood out of Charleston on 8 January 1946. Following shakedown training out of Little Creek, VA, the ship headed south to Florida on 7 February, arriving at Green Cove Springs on 10 February, where she was placed in reserve. On 31 July, she was decommissioned and berthed at Green Cove Springs in the Atlantic Reserve Fleet.

=== Korean War ===
After being recommissioned on 16 September 1950 LSMR-536 completed outfitting at Savannah, GA, and, on 20 November, got underway for shakedown training out of Little Creek. She ultimately departed the waters of Chesapeake Bay on 1 March 1951 for duty with the Pacific Fleet. She transited the Panama Canal on 14 March and arrived in San Diego, ten days later. There, she became a unit of LSMR Division 3 and spent the next 14 months practicing her amphibious support role off San Clemente Island.

On 12 May 1952, LSMR-536 departed San Diego in company with USS St. Joseph's River and three large landing support ships, and the formation steamed by way of Pearl Harbor and Midway, reaching Yokosuka, Japan, on 19 June. Later, she shifted to Sasebo to prepare for her first deployment in the combat zone off the Korean coast. She embarked upon that cruise in mid-July and arrived off Chodo, an island off the western coast of Korea in the southern portion of the Korea Bay, on the 16th. She patrolled on station at that location until 15 August when she headed back to Japan.

After visits to Sasebo and Yokosuka, LSMR-536 conducted landing exercises at Chigasaki late in September 1952. The rocket practice on Japanese territory prompted an official protest from the Japanese Foreign Ministry. She returned to Yokosuka and Sasebo, making runs between the ports during October and most of November. On 27 November, the ship cleared Sasebo to return to the vicinity of Chodo. That assignment, consisting mostly of night illumination fire, lasted until mid-December when she headed back to Japan. LSMR-536 remained at Sasebo from 19 December 1952 until 18 January 1953. She returned briefly to Chodo on 20 January and then began patrolling Taenchong Do, Paengnyong Do, and Kirin Do.

She returned to Yokosuka on 13 February 1953 and remained there until the 24th when she got underway to return home. Steaming by way of Midway and Pearl Harbor, the warship arrived in San Diego on 24 March. Following training operations off San Clemente Island, she was overhauled at the Mare Island Naval Shipyard. All told, she remained on the West Coast 11 months, departing from San Diego to return to the western Pacific on 10 February 1954.

After pausing en route at Pearl Harbor and Midway, LSMR-536 reached Yokosuka on 11 March 1954. Though the ship returned to the Korean coast periodically during her second tour of duty with the 7th Fleet, combat operations played no part in her activities, because hostilities had been effectively ended by the armistice of 19 July 1953. She concluded her first peacetime deployment to East Asia when she reentered San Diego on 7 November 1954. She spent the year 1955 engaged in operations out of San Diego, primarily amphibious training off San Clemente Island. On 1 October 1955, she was renamed White River.

White River departed San Diego on 4 January 1956 and arrived at Yokosuka on 6 February. She participated in a large-scale amphibious maneuvers at Iwo Jima later that month and then returned briefly to Yokosuka before heading home on 3 March, arriving back in San Diego on 31 March to resume local operations. On 7 September 1956, she was decommissioned and berthed with the San Diego Group of the Pacific Reserve Fleet.

=== Vietnam War ===
Hostilities in Asia again dictated the ship's return to service, this time in South Vietnam. White River was moved from San Diego to the Long Beach Naval Shipyard in June 1965 where she underwent extensive modifications before her recommissioning there alongside sister ship USS Carronade on 2 October 1965. White River departed Long Beach on 30 October and headed for San Diego whence she conducted shakedown and shore bombardment drills. On 8 February 1966, she departed San Diego to rejoin the 7th Fleet in the Far East. She and her division stopped in the Hawaiian Islands for about two weeks during which they conducted additional shore bombardment drills at Kahoʻolawe Island before resuming their voyage west on 1 March. She stopped at Midway Island on 5 March and reached Yokosuka ten days later. Training and port visits in Japan occupied her next eight weeks. On 9 May, she departed her homeport of Yokosuka for the coast of South Vietnam by way of Subic Bay, Philippines.

White River arrived off the I Corps zone of operations on 25 May 1966 and immediately began gunfire support missions for Operation Mobile. Two days later, she concluded her support of Mobile and shifted to support for the Army of the Republic of Vietnam (ARVN) 2nd Division operating near Quang Ngai. She continued to support that unit intermittently for the next two months, interrupting this duty only to provide gunfire and rockets for three other operations: Oakland; Deckhouse III, an amphibious landing; and Franklin. At the conclusion of the latter operation, she headed—via Subic Bay and Hong Kong for Yokosuka where she remained until 16 September.

After another stop at Subic Bay for emergency repairs after being caught in three storms while en route to the Philippines, White River returned to the Vietnamese coast at the end of September 1966 to continue gunfire support for the troops ashore. During the next two months, she provided call fire in the northern portion of the II Corps Tactical Zone and in the southern portion of the III Corps, totaling 17,700 rockets and 1,700 5-inch shells since 1 May. This fire destroyed over 5,000 structures, killed 207 Viet Cong (VC) and destroyed 175 sampans plus food, ammunition and petrol stores. On 30 November, she terminated her second tour of duty in Vietnamese waters and headed, via Okinawa, to Yokosuka where she spent the remainder of the year in upkeep due to persistent maintenance issues.

White River departed Japan once more on 23 January 1967. Again, she stopped at Subic Bay, first to load ammunition and then to complete some maintenance work in preparation for a year in which she would conduct operations across the entire length of South Vietnam. She returned to the coast of the I Corps tactical zone on 9 February and began delivering gunfire for Marines ashore engaged in Operation Desoto. Also during that period, White River escorted convoys of trucks near the Vietnamese Demilitarized Zone (DMZ) dividing North and South Vietnam. She concluded that assignment on 11 February, refueled at Danang, and got underway to support Operation Deckhouse VI, an amphibious operation which was conducted by the Special Landing Force near the Sa Huynh Base in the southern reaches of the I Corps tactical zone as an extension of the Desoto operation which had been temporarily halted during the Tết holidays. She finished her part in Desoto-Deckhouse VI operations on 23 February and headed for Subic Bay where she rearmed and conducted upkeep from 24 February to 2 March. White River returned to the Vietnamese coast on 13 March and resumed shore bombardment duties in support of Operation Beacon Hill, a combined helicopter, and waterborne, amphibious assault conducted near Dong Ha. On 23 March, released from the Beacon Hill operation, she rearmed at Cam Ranh Bay, then proceeded to the III Corps tactical zone to provide gunfire support for operations near the Rung Sat Special Zone.

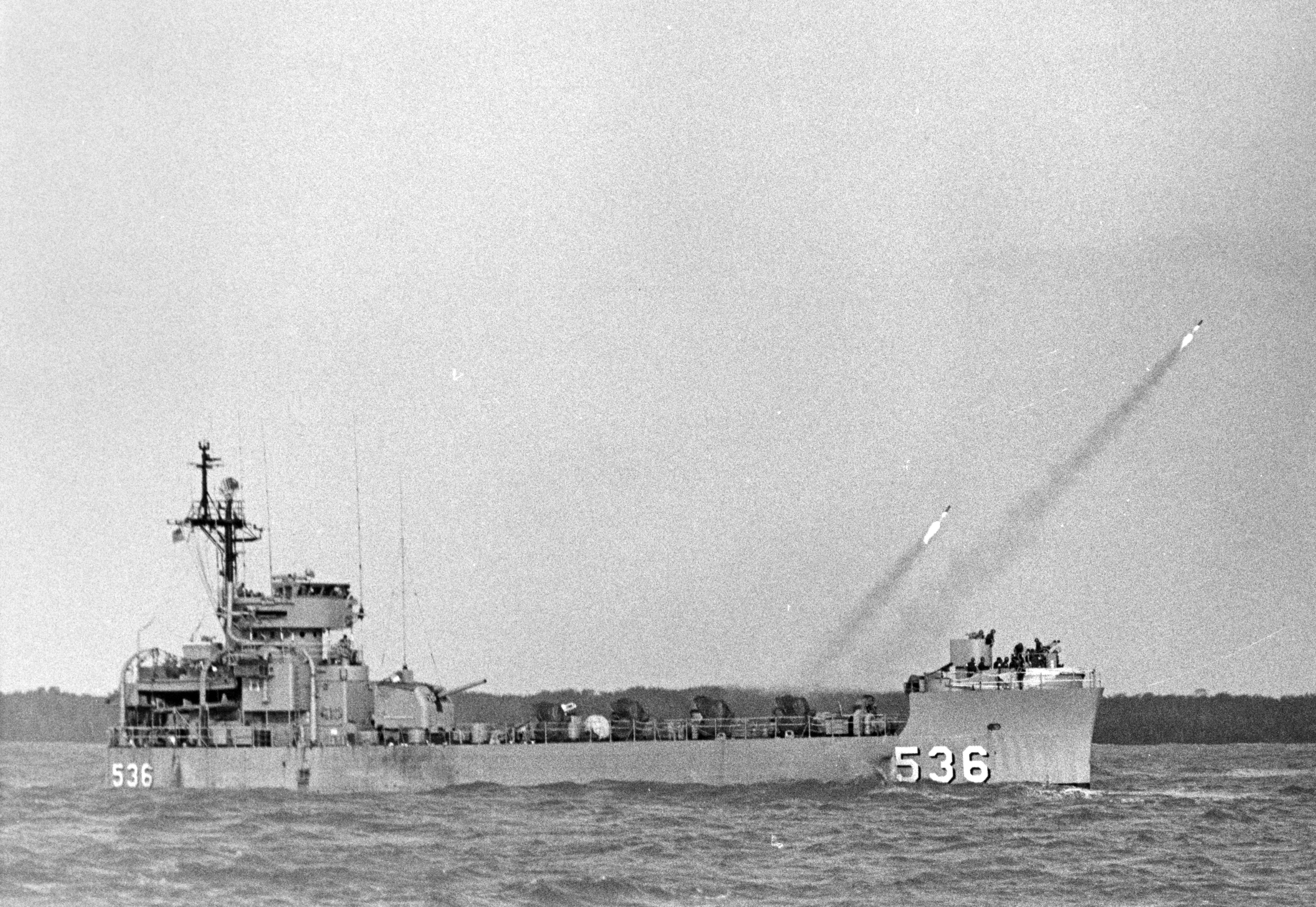
USS White River firing a pair of rockets at a Viet Cong infiltrated village in South Vietnam

Relieved by USS Carronade on 2 April 1967, White River returned to Yokosuka on 17 April after a four-day stop at Keelung, Taiwan, en route. She made necessary repairs at Yokosuka and then headed back to Vietnam on 29 May. Following ammunition replenishment at Subic Bay, the warship arrived off the I Corps tactical zone on 11 June and conducted shore bombardments there and in the II Corps zone until 21 July when she departed Vietnamese waters to return to Subic Bay for upkeep. White River returned to the Vietnamese coast at the beginning of August and stayed there until 23 August. The ship then returned to Yokosuka at the end of the month, arriving there on 8 September and remaining until 16 October for repairs. She began her last 1967 tour of duty off the Vietnamese coast on 31 October. It lasted until 27 December and consisted almost entirely of gunfire support for forces operating in the II Corps tactical zone, during which White River fired its 50,000th rocket. At its conclusion, she was relieved by USS Clarion River and returned to Subic Bay for upkeep.

During 1968, White River continued to operate out of her home port, Yokosuka, and made four deployments to Vietnam waters to render gunfire support for U.S. and ARVN troops. During January, White River relieved Clarion River in providing gunfire support for South Korean troops during search-and-destroy Operation Meng Ho Kuho north of Qui Nhon (16-24 January and 27–29 January). Early the following month, the ship supported the ARVN 2nd Division in the same region (2-3 February), and late the following month, White River again worked with South Korean units, the Capital Division in two instances (22-24 March and 29–31 March) and the 9th Division (28 March). She reprised gunfire support for those Korean units the following month, the Capital Division on 1–2 April, and the 9th Division on 2 April and in three other instances: 16–17 April, 21–23 April, and 27 April); in addition, her armament assisted in Operation Cochise (11-12 April). Subsequently, returning to the gun line, White River, with an assist from an airborne spotter on 15 July pounded a suspected VC storage area, a series of caves about 10 miles (16 km) southeast of Qui Nhon Bay, with over 1,000 spin-stabilized projectiles, igniting more than 47 secondary explosions and nearly a dozen fires. Before she would return to Vietnamese waters, the ship was reclassified to an inshore fire support ship, LFR-536, on 14 August 1968. The ship then operated off the IV Corps zone in December, supporting the ARVN 21st Division on four occasions (1-5 December, 12–14 December, 21–23 December, and 26–28 December) and Operation Bold Dragon IX on 28–29 December.

White River spent four days on the front-line in late January 1969, off the I and II Corps areas, supporting the 1st Battalion, 2nd ARVN Division. Responding to a call for gunfire support after the ARVN troops had suffered 15 killed in an assault on an enemy stronghold on 27 January, White River fired upon a North Vietnamese position on the north side of a small hill, 11 miles (18 km) south of the Batangan Peninsula, Quang Ngai Province. A two-hour bombardment killed two VC, wounded one, leveled or damaged 24 structures and started five secondary fires. The next day (28 January), the inshore fire support ship bombarded an enemy staging area 0.5 miles (0.80 km) from the previous day's target, killing 15 VC and destroying 54 structures, 11 of which were of heavy masonry construction and six of which had been used to store petroleum, oil, and lubricant. Additionally, White River's fire damaged 21 other structures and destroyed nine bunkers and 35 meters of trail, triggering five secondary explosions and starting 45 secondary fires. "Still not content to rest on her laurels," a Pacific Fleet chronicler wrote later, "White River directed her 5-inch spin-stabilized rockets at enemy positions in the same area on the 29th and silenced an antiaircraft site," killing or wounding 11 VC.

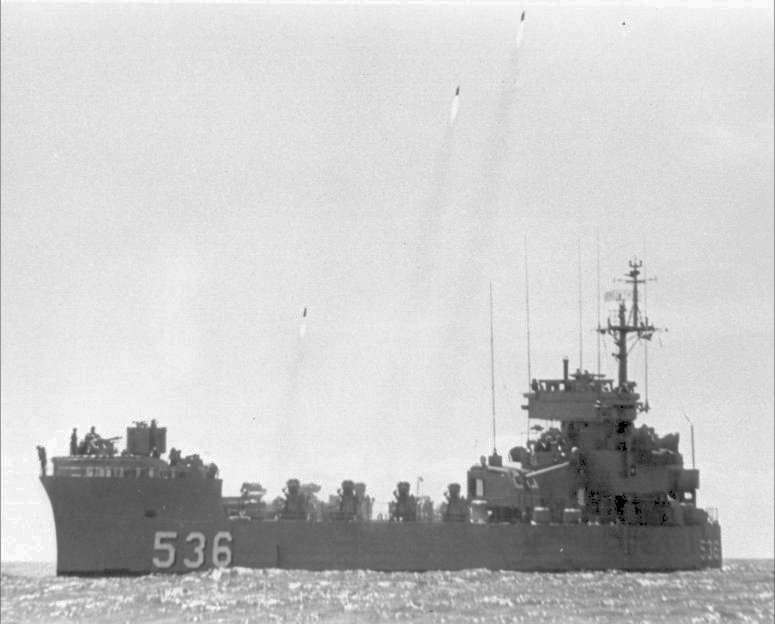
USS White River firing rockets

On 11 February 1969, White River participated in a "multiple force operation" in the southern part of the Ca Mau peninsula, which involved the deployment of air, ground and sea forces, including ten Swift boats (PCFs), in an attempt to cover the numerous rivers in the area. After a trio of PCFs had conducted a psychological warfare operation on the Trum Gong River, four Swifts entered the Nang only to encounter heavy VC automatic weapon and B-40 rocket fire that scored direct hits on two PCFs (one losing an engine and the other being badly damaged), wounding one sailor. Air Force fixed-wing strikes destroyed some 30 bunkers and 200 meters of trench line; White River joined in the fray, unleashing a bombardment of the enemy positions "but with unknown results."

During 1–5 May 1969, White River supported the ARVN 2nd Division, the South Korean 2nd Marine Brigade and U.S. forces in Operation Daring Rebel, killing an estimated four VC, destroying 12 watercraft and 35 structures, damaging 27 bunkers and other structures, triggering ten secondary explosions and igniting 13 secondary fires. Additionally, the inshore fire support ship set fire to 500 meters of tree line and damaged three rice storage bins and 24 acres of rice crops. White River's work prompted a response: the ship observed six-foot surface bursts, 800 to 1,000-yards short of the ship of between 8 and 10 shells of unknown size being fired at her on the evening of 3 May.

In June 1969 White River was assigned to the naval gunfire support units for only four days, but she "displayed accurate marksmanship during one day of particularly impressive shooting..." On 16 June 1969, while operating in support of the ARVN 2nd Division 8 miles (13 km) northeast of Quang Ngai, she bombarded a VC assembly area, flushing out a squad of VC who soon began setting up weapons to return fire. White River observed a 20 feet (6.1 m) surface burst some 2,000 yards (1,800 m) off the bow, and numerous rounds of light weapons fire that all missed their mark. With the coaching of an airborne spotter, it directed a ten-minute barrage of .30- and .50-caliber machine gun, 40 millimeter autocannon, and rocket fire onto the VC, who broke and took cover leaving behind 11 of their number dead behind. White River continued to pound the area until inclement weather forced the spotter to head for home. In addition to the 10 enemy counted, the ship had destroyed 13 structures and 10 bunkers and damaged a further 21 structures and 11 bunkers, triggered three secondary explosions and started nine secondary fires. White River reprised her bombardment the next day (17 June) and accounted for another two VC dead.

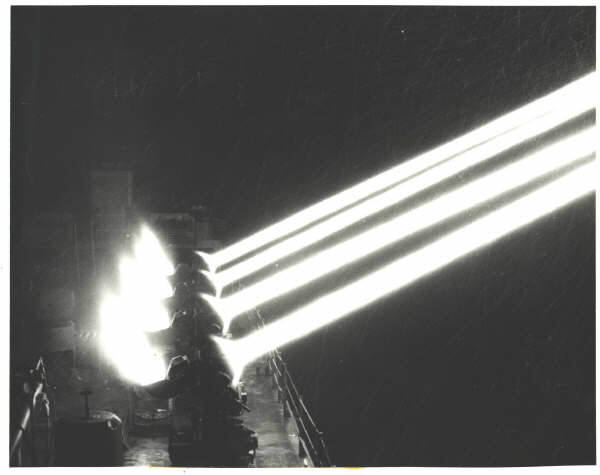
USS White River firing a salvo of four rockets off the coast of North Vietnam at night

White River supported the 1st Australian Task Force in Phuoc Tuy Province, in the III Corps zone, during the period 22–27 October 1969, unleashing a barrage of 5-inch spin-stabilized rockets on 28 enemy targets. VC base camps, storage areas, bunkers, infiltration routes and sampans all came under the ship's devastating fire; her claimed "pinpoint accuracy" killed 18 VC, wounded 17, destroyed some 97 structures and bunkers and damaged 35; in addition, she destroyed two weapons sites and triggered 13 secondary explosions. After supporting the ARVN 7th Division (2-5 November, 7 November) and the ARVN 9th Division (6 November) in the IV Corps Zone, White River returned to the III Corps Tactical Zone and again worked with the 1st Australian Task Force (8 November). "Along with deleteriously affecting enemy morale," one observer wrote, the inshore fire support ship killed 15 VC troops, wounded 17, and destroyed four caves, 41 bunkers, and 46 structures. In addition, observers counted 18 secondary fires and 12 explosions, and numbered damaged caves, bunkers and structures among the ship's destructive handiwork.

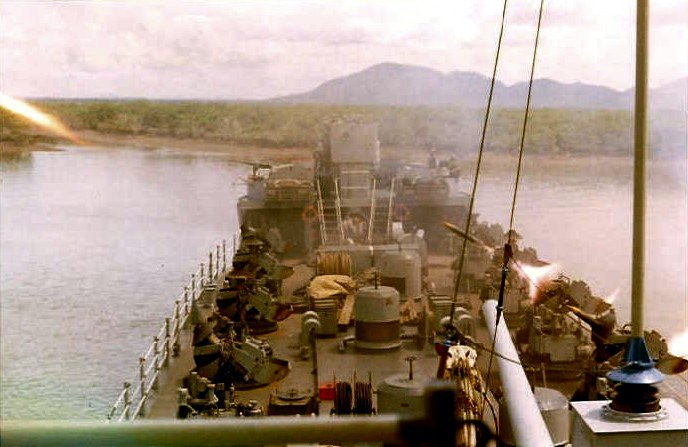
USS White River firing rockets in the Rung Sat Special Zone (RSSZ) in South Vietnam in 1969

White River returned to Vietnamese waters in January 1970. On 30–31 January, the ship operated off the Cà Mau Peninsula, in the IV Corps area, supporting the ARVN 21st Division, then lent her powerful ordnance to the same unit on three occasions the following month (1-4 February, 10–19 February, and 22–25 February). Additionally, she provided gunfire support for Sea Float operations in the same region (21 February). As she neared the end of her active service life on 17 March, accompanied by river patrol craft with an umbrella of air support, she "penetrated deep into the Rung Sat Special Zone, southeast of Saigon in support of Operation Chuong Duong 11-70," steaming up the Long Tau River some 18 miles (29 km) to bombard suspected VC positions. Over a five-hour period on that day, White River expended 2,526 spin-stabilized projectiles in the "deepest penetration inland of an NGFS [naval gunfire support ship] to date." Although the thick foliage canopy did not permit ready damage assessment, observers noted ten secondary fires burning upon the conclusion of the ship's bombardment. "This mission," a Commander in Chief, Pacific Fleet, historian noted, "also marked the final appearance of the LFR in active service." As the same chronicler noted: "A dramatic rise [for March 1970] in the expenditure of spin-stabilized rockets (16,083 in March) reflected the final efforts of Clarion River ... and White River ... as these intensely proud little ships concluded their last cruise before being stricken from the Naval Register."

After being deemed "unfit for further naval service" on 8 May 1970, White River was decommissioned at Yokosuka on 22 May 1970. Her name was stricken from the Naval Vessel Register that same day, and she was sold for scrapping in November 1970.

== Awards ==
- Combat Action Ribbon
- 3 Navy Unit Commendations
- Meritorious Unit Commendation
- National Defense Service Medal with star
- Korean Service Medal with 2 battle stars
- Vietnam Service Medal with 8 battle stars
- RVN Gallantry Cross with Palm
- RVN Civil Action Medal, First Class, with Palm
- United Nations Service Medal
- Korean War Service Medal (South Korea)
- Republic of Vietnam Campaign Medal
