= Georgios Kountouriotis =

Greek ship-owner and politician

- Γεώργιος Κουντουριώτης (Greek); Γιώργ Κουντουριότι (Arvanitika Albanian)
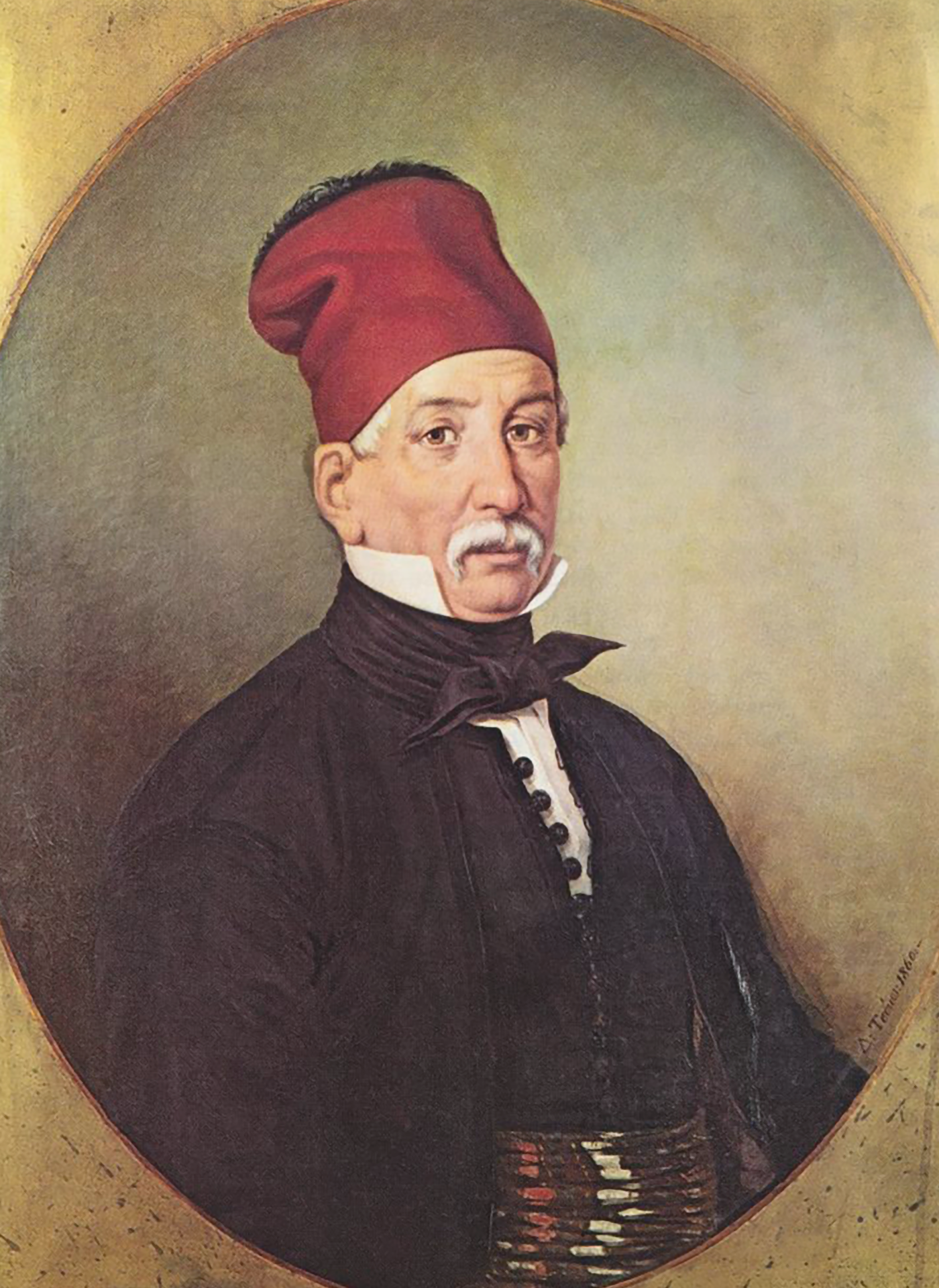
- Georgios Kountouriotis by Dionysios Tsokos

Prime Minister of Greece
- In office 4 March 1848 – 15 October 1848
- Monarch: Otto
- Preceded by: Kitsos Tzavelas
- Succeeded by: Konstantinos Kanaris

President of the Provisional Administration of Greece
- In office 2 April 1832 – 9 September 1832
- Preceded by: Augustinos Kapodistrias
- Succeeded by: Otto (Note: Josef Ludwig von Armansperg as Regent) (as King of Greece); Spyridon Trikoupis (as Prime Minister of Greece)
- In office 18 January 1824 – 29 April 1826
- Preceded by: Petrobey Mavromichalis
- Succeeded by: Andreas Zaimis

Personal details
- Born: c. 1782 Hydra, Ottoman Empire (now Greece)
- Died: 13 March 1858 (aged 76) Athens, Kingdom of Greece
- Party: French Party
- Relations: Lazaros Kountouriotis (brother); Pavlos Kountouriotis (grandson); Nikolaos Votsis (great-grandson)
- Occupation: Ship-owner; Revolutionary; Politician

Military service
- Allegiance: (Greece) First Hellenic Republic
- Branch/service: Hellenic Navy
- Battles/wars: Greek War of Independence

Georgios Kountouriotis (Greek: Γεώργιος Κουντουριώτης; 1782 – 13 March 1858) was a Greek ship-owner and politician who served as prime minister from March to October 1848.

== Life ==
He was born in 1782 on the Saronic island of Hydra to an Arvanite family. The family, apparently the richest in independent Greece, stemmed from the younger son of an Albanian peasant. He settled the island as a boatman after the Venetians left the Peloponnese (1715) but before the island received its permanent colony. The Koundouriotis family used extensively their native Albanian dialect of Hydra. The dialect has been documented in two letters of Georgios' private correspondence with Ioannis Orlandos, written in the Greek alphabet, in accordance with the practice of the writers of Arvanitika during the Greek War of Independence. Georgios spoke Greek only with difficulty. He was the brother of Lazaros Kountouriotis, another shipowner of the Greek War of Independence.

When the War of Independence broke out, Georgios, along with the rest of the Kountouriotis family, supported the effort with generous donations as well as with their ships. He was often at odds with other Hydriot sea captains but ultimately was the wealthiest. Georgios Kountouriotis became a member of the executive committee of the Greek Revolution and served as its president from 1823 to 1826 during the crucial time of the siege of Missolonghi.

After independence, he became a member of the cabinet of Ioannis Kapodistrias, the first governor of Greece. He was a semi-independent adherent of the French Party mostly due to his antipathy to the Russian Party and his fellow Hydriots of the English Party. During the period of French Party ascendancy in the reign of King Otto, he served as prime minister.

Kountouriotis died in Athens in 1858. He was the grandfather of Pavlos Kountouriotis who fought in the First Balkan War and later served as the first (1924-1926) President of the Second Hellenic Republic.

Political offices
Preceded by Petrobey Mavromichalis	President of the Executive; 18 January 1824 – 29 April 1826	Succeeded by Andreas Zaimis as President of the Governmental Commission
Preceded by Kitsos Tzavelas	Prime Minister of Greece; 19 March 1848 – 27 October 1848	Succeeded by Konstantinos Kanaris
