= Pantelis Horn =

Greek naval officer and playwright

Pantelis Horn (Greek: Παντελής Χορν; 1 January 1881 – 1 November 1941) was a Greek naval officer and playwright, one of the few Greek writers of the early 20th century who devoted themselves solely to theatre. He produced works in the naturalist style.

Horn was born in Trieste to an Austrian father and a Greek mother. Horn also served as an officer in the Hellenic Navy, graduating in 1899 from the Hellenic Naval Academy. As a commander, he was one of the first Navy officers to be transferred to the newly constituted Hellenic Coast Guard, where he remained for the rest of his career, retiring on 28 October 1926 with the rank of Rear Admiral.

His son Dimitris Horn would go on to become a well-known actor.

== Works ==
Horn wrote more than thirty plays during his career, including:

- The Outsider (1906)
- Petroharides (The Stonecutters; 1908), Horn's performance debut
- To Fintanaki (The Sapling or The Young Plant; 1921), a "considerable hit"
- Flantro (1935), about an aristocratic widow
