= John Hannum =

John Hannum may refer to:

- John Hannum III, American politician, businessman and colonial militiaman
- John Berne Hannum, United States federal judge
