= Greek destroyer Kountouriotis (1931) =

History

Greece
- Namesake: Pavlos Kountouriotis
- Builder: Cantieri Odero
- Launched: August 29, 1931
- Commissioned: November 1932
- Decommissioned: 1946
- Fate: Scrapped, September 1946

General characteristics
- Class & type: Kountouriotis-class destroyer
- Displacement: Full load 2,050 tons; Standard 1,389 tons
- Length: 92 m (302 ft)
- Beam: 9.5 m (31 ft)
- Draft: 3.65 m (12.0 ft)
- Installed power: 3 × Yarrow boilers; 44,000 shp (33,000 kW)
- Propulsion: 2 shafts; 2 geared steam turbines
- Speed: 38 knots (70 km/h; 44 mph)
- Complement: 156
- Armament: 4 × 4.7 in (120 mm) (4 × 1); 3 × 40 mm A/A guns (3 × 1); 4 × 13.2 mm (0.52 in) MG; 6 × 21 in torpedo tubes; 54 mines

Kountouriotis (Greek: ΒΠ Κουντουριώτης) was a Greek destroyer of the Kountouriotis class, which served with the Hellenic Navy during the Second World War. It was named after the admiral and politician Pavlos Kountouriotis, who was the commander of the Greek Fleet during the Balkan Wars, as well as serving twice as President of the Second Hellenic Republic. She was the second ship to bear this name.

She was constructed in Sestri Ponente, Italy, by Cantieri Odero, and commissioned by the Hellenic Navy in 1933. After the outbreak of the Greco-Italian War, she participated in the naval operations, especially in the second and third naval raids against Italian shipping in the Strait of Otranto (December 15–16, 1940, and 4–5 January 1941). During the German invasion of Greece, along with several other ships, she managed to flee to Alexandria. Subsequently, she underwent repairs and modernization in Bombay from June 1941 to April 1942. She returned to escort duties in the Mediterranean Sea, with the British pennant number H07, until November 15, 1943, when she was placed in active reserve. She was decommissioned in 1946.

== Bibliography ==
- Whitley, M. J. (2000). Destroyers of World War Two: An International Encyclopedia. London: Cassell & Co. ISBN 1-85409-521-8.
