= Pavlos Kountouriotis =

Greek admiral and head of state (1855–1935)

- Παύλος Κουντουριώτης
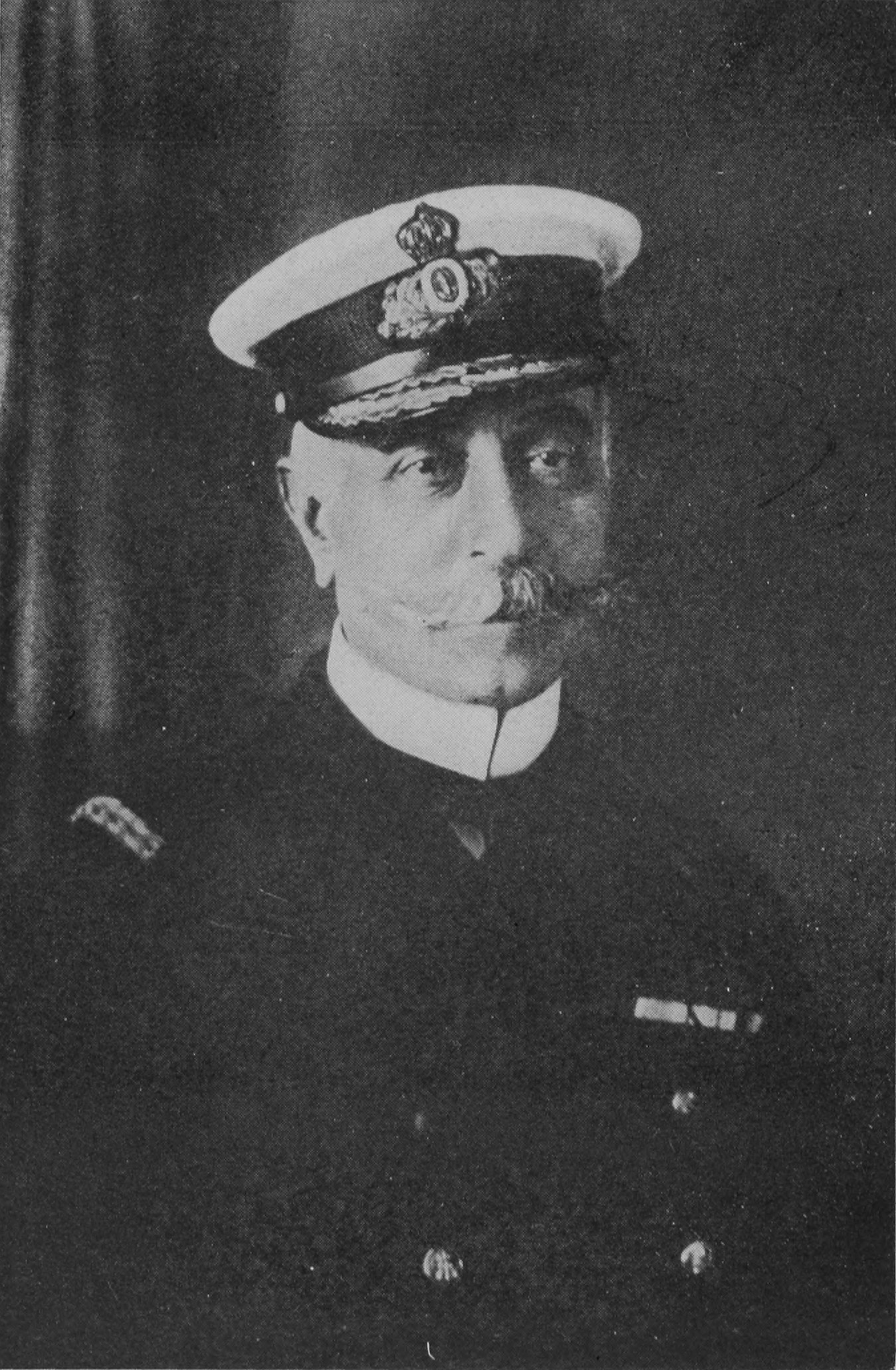
- Kountouriotis c. 1915

President of Greece
- In office 22 August 1926 – 10 December 1929
- Prime Minister: See list: Georgios Kondylis; Alexandros Zaimis; Eleftherios Venizelos
- Preceded by: Theodoros Pangalos
- Succeeded by: Alexandros Zaimis
- In office 25 March 1924 – 15 March 1926
- Prime Minister: See list: Alexandros Papanastasiou; Themistoklis Sofoulis; Andreas Michalakopoulos; Theodoros Pangalos
- Preceded by: George II (as King of the Hellenes)
- Succeeded by: Theodoros Pangalos

Regent of Greece
- In office 23 December 1923 – 25 March 1924
- Monarch: George II
- Prime Minister: See list: Stylianos Gonatas; Eleftherios Venizelos; Georgios Kafantaris; Alexandros Papanastasiou
- In office 28 October 1920 – 17 November 1920
- Monarch: Interregnum
- Prime Minister: Eleftherios Venizelos
- Succeeded by: Queen Mother Olga

Minister of the Navy
- In office 24 September 1915 – 9 June 1916
- Monarch: Constantine I
- Prime Minister: Alexandros Zaimis; Stefanos Skouloudis
- Preceded by: Athanasios N. Miaoulis
- Succeeded by: Konstantinos Kallaris

Personal details
- Born: 9 April 1855 Hydra, Kingdom of Greece
- Died: 22 August 1935 (aged 80) Palaio Faliro, Second Hellenic Republic
- Resting place: Hydra, Greece
- Party: Independent (Venizelist)
- Spouses: Angeliki Petrokokkinou (m. 1889; died 1903) Helen Koupas (m. 1918)
- Relations: Georgios Kountouriotis (grandfather); Lazaros Kountouriotis (great-uncle); Nikolaos Votsis (nephew)
- Children: 3, including Theodoros
- Occupation: Naval officer; politician
- Awards: Grand Commander of the Order of the Redeemer

Military service
- Allegiance: Kingdom of Greece
- Branch/service: Royal Hellenic Navy
- Years of service: 1875–1917
- Rank: Návarchos (admiral)
- Commands: Alfeios; Miaoulis; Georgios Averof
- Battles/wars: Greco-Turkish War (1897); Cretan Revolt; Balkan Wars; First Balkan War; First Battle of Lemnos; Battle of Lesbos; Battle of Elli; Second Battle of Lemnos; Second Balkan War

Pavlos Kountouriotis (Greek: Παύλος Κουντουριώτης, romanized: Pávlos Kountouriótis; 9 April 1855 – 22 August 1935) was a Greek admiral who served during the Balkan Wars, was regent of Greece, and the first president of the Second Hellenic Republic. In total he served four times as head of the Greek state, the most times in the history of the seat.

== Early life ==
Pavlos Kountouriotis was born on the island of Hydra to Theodoros Kountouriotis, Consul and Member of the Greek Parliament and Loukia Negreponte. From his father's side he descended from the Kountouriotis, an Arvanite Hydriot family originally from the village of Kountoura, in the Megarid. Pavlos used Arvanitika frequently as well, and his personal secretary wrote about him that whenever he traveled to Hydra, he preferred to use only Arvanitika. He was the grandson of Georgios, a shipowner who like many members of his family, participated in the Greek War of Independence and served as Prime Minister of Greece under King Otto. From his mother's side he was descended from the Negreponte family, a prominent family from Chios and was great-grandson of Constantine Hangerli, Prince of Wallachia. He was the second of nine children, including Ioannis Kountouriotis. Little is known of Pavlos's childhood. In 1875, following his family's long-standing naval tradition, he joined the Royal Hellenic Navy, presumably in the rank of Ensign.

== Naval service ==
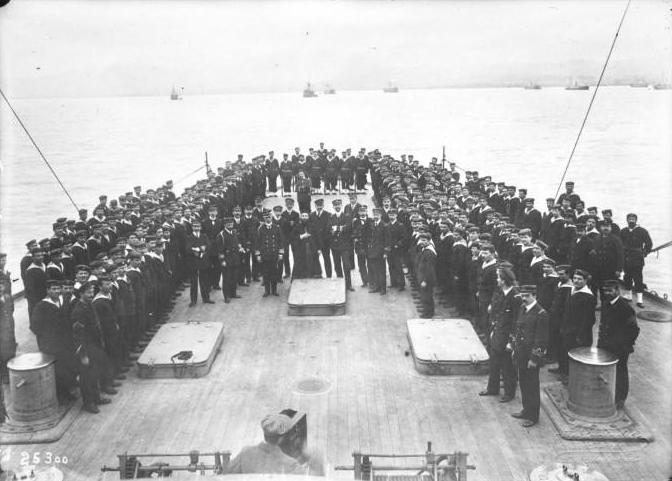
Kountouriotis and crew on the deck of Georgios Averof, 1912

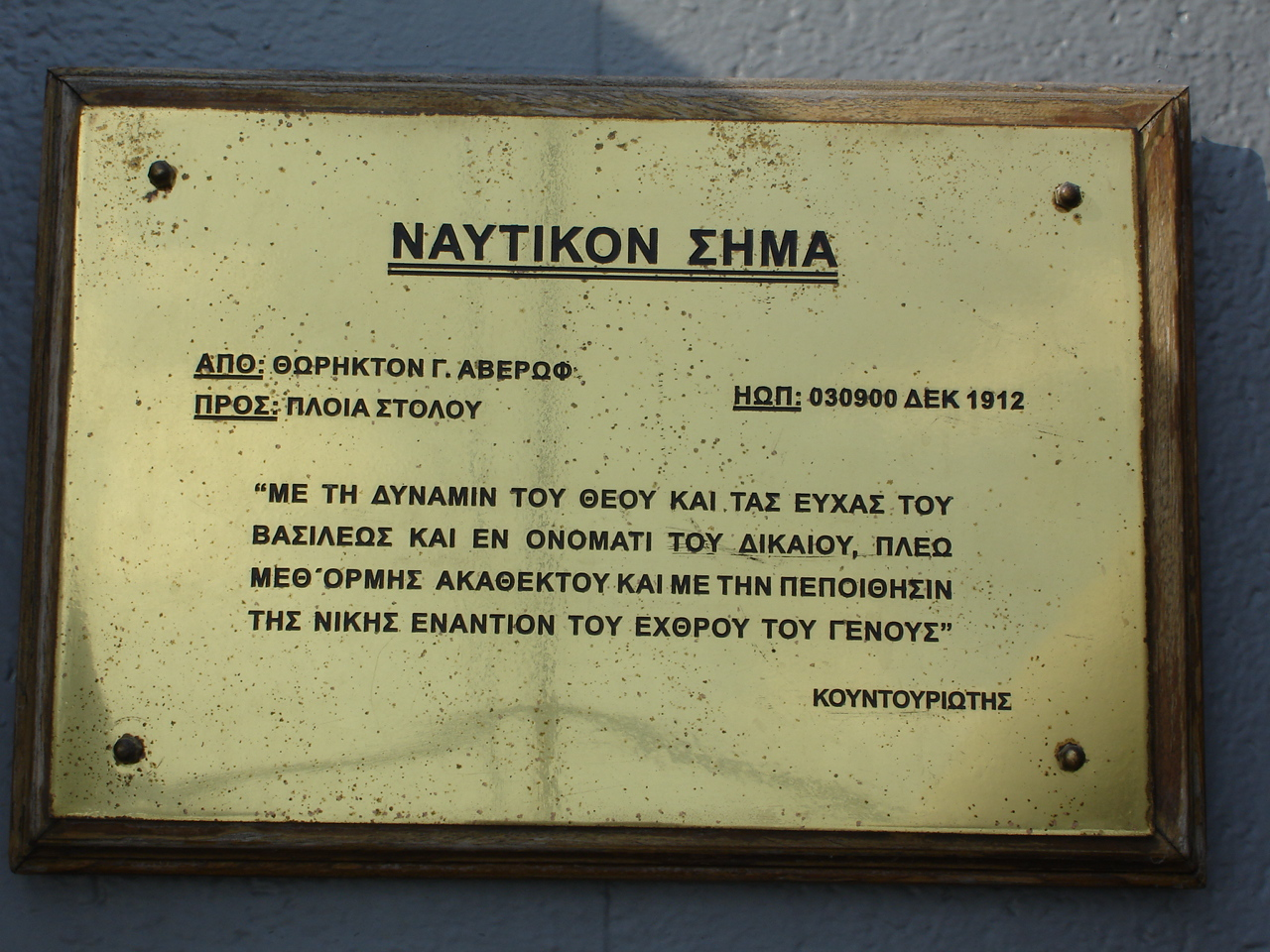
The signal sent by Admiral Kountouriotis from the cruiser Georgios Averof to the fleet, at the start of the Battle of Elli.-- Translated it reads: "By the power of God and with the wishes of the King and in the name of Justice, I sail with unstoppable force and with confidence about victory against the enemy of the race."

=== First achievements ===
In 1886, he took part in the naval operations at Preveza as a lieutenant. During the Greco-Turkish War of 1897, serving as lieutenant commander, he commanded the ship Alfeios. His ship took part in at least two landings of Greek troops on the island of Crete in support of the Cretan Revolt.

In 1900, Kountouriotis, as the commanding officer of the three-masted cruiser Navarchos Miaoulis, crossed the Atlantic Ocean and brought the flag of the Hellenic Navy to the New World for the very first time. His orders were to present the flag of the Hellenic Navy to the 60,000 Greeks living in the U.S., but also to be the first exploratory mission of independent Greece. William McKinley, the President of the United States, invited Kountouriotis to the White House.

Kountouriotis served as an aide-de-camp to King George I from 1908 until 1911, receiving the rank of Captain in 1909. In June 1911, Kountouriotis was sent to Britain to take control of the newly commissioned Georgios Averof, following the "blue cheese mutiny". As he was highly esteemed, he quickly reimposed discipline and set sail for Greece.

=== Balkan Wars ===
On 16 April 1912, he was appointed Chief of the Navy General Staff until 16 September, when he was appointed of the Aegean Fleet, in view of the worsening situation in the Balkans, and the imminent outbreak of the First Balkan War.

Kountouriotis played a crucial role in the Greek government's decision to enter the war. Partly because the Greek fleet had not yet completed its modernisation programme, and in view of the disaster of 1897, the Greek leadership remained ambivalent about Greece's prospects. Kountouriotis weighed in decisively in these discussions, proclaiming his confidence that even with the existing fleet, victory could be achieved, thanks to superior personnel. His reply to Prime Minister Eleftherios Venizelos became famous:

Mr. President, I do not occupy myself with x plus y and angles of divergence. I know to speak of one thing. Ships without capable personnel are [nothing but] heavy lead that sinks in water. I assure you that with the ships we have, we shall do our job well.

During the Balkan Wars, with his flagship, Georgios Averof, he led the Greek Navy to major victories against the Turkish fleet in December 1912 (Battle of Elli) and in January 1913 (Battle of Limnos), bringing most of the Aegean islands under Greek control. His victories, due in large part to his daring but successful tactics, earned him the status of a national hero. He was promoted to vice admiral for "exceptional war service", the first Greek career officer since Konstantinos Kanaris to reach the rank (usually reserved for members of the Greek royal family).

== Politics ==
In 1916, he became a minister in the Stephanos Skouloudis government, but, in disagreement with the pro-German feelings of King Constantine I, he followed Eleftherios Venizelos to Thessaloniki where he was assigned the ministry of Naval Affairs in Venizelos's National Defence government. Constantine was deposed and replaced on the throne by his second-eldest son, Alexander. Kountouriotis subsequently retired from the navy with the honorary rank of full Admiral. On the death of the young Alexander in 1920, he was elected Regent of Greece by the Greek Parliament on 28 October by a vote of 137 to 3. After the sitting government of Venizelos was defeated in the elections that took place in November 1920, Kountouriotis resigned as Regent on 17 November, to be replaced by Queen Olga, King Alexander's grandmother. The following month, Constantine was restored.

=== President ===
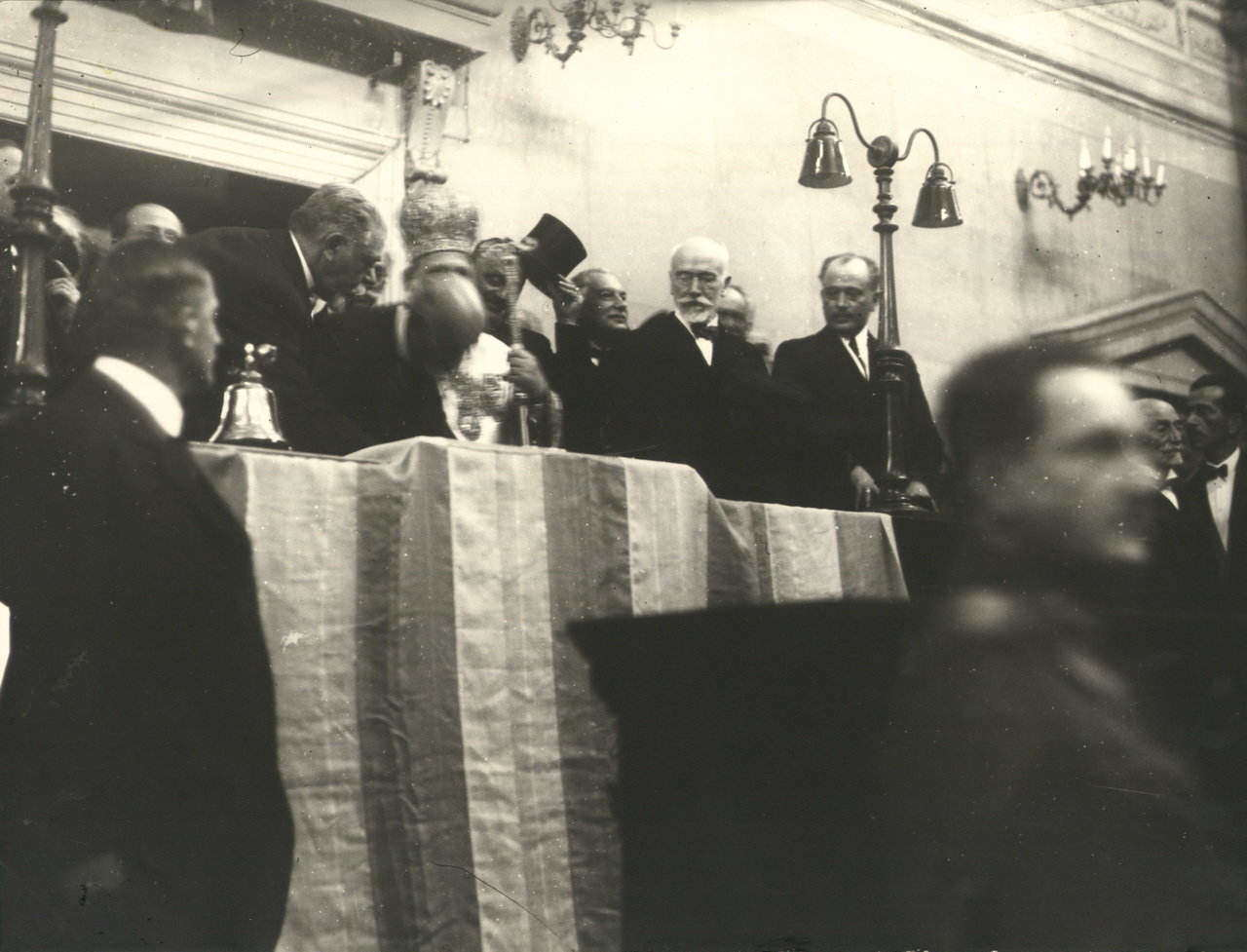
Kountouriotis in 1924 is sworn in as the first President of the Second Hellenic Republic

After King George II of Greece was deposed, he served as the first president (provisional) of the Second Hellenic Republic, from September 1925 until his resignation in March 1926; in opposition to General Pangalos's dictatorship. He served a second time as a provisional president from August 1926 until December 1929.

== Death and honours ==
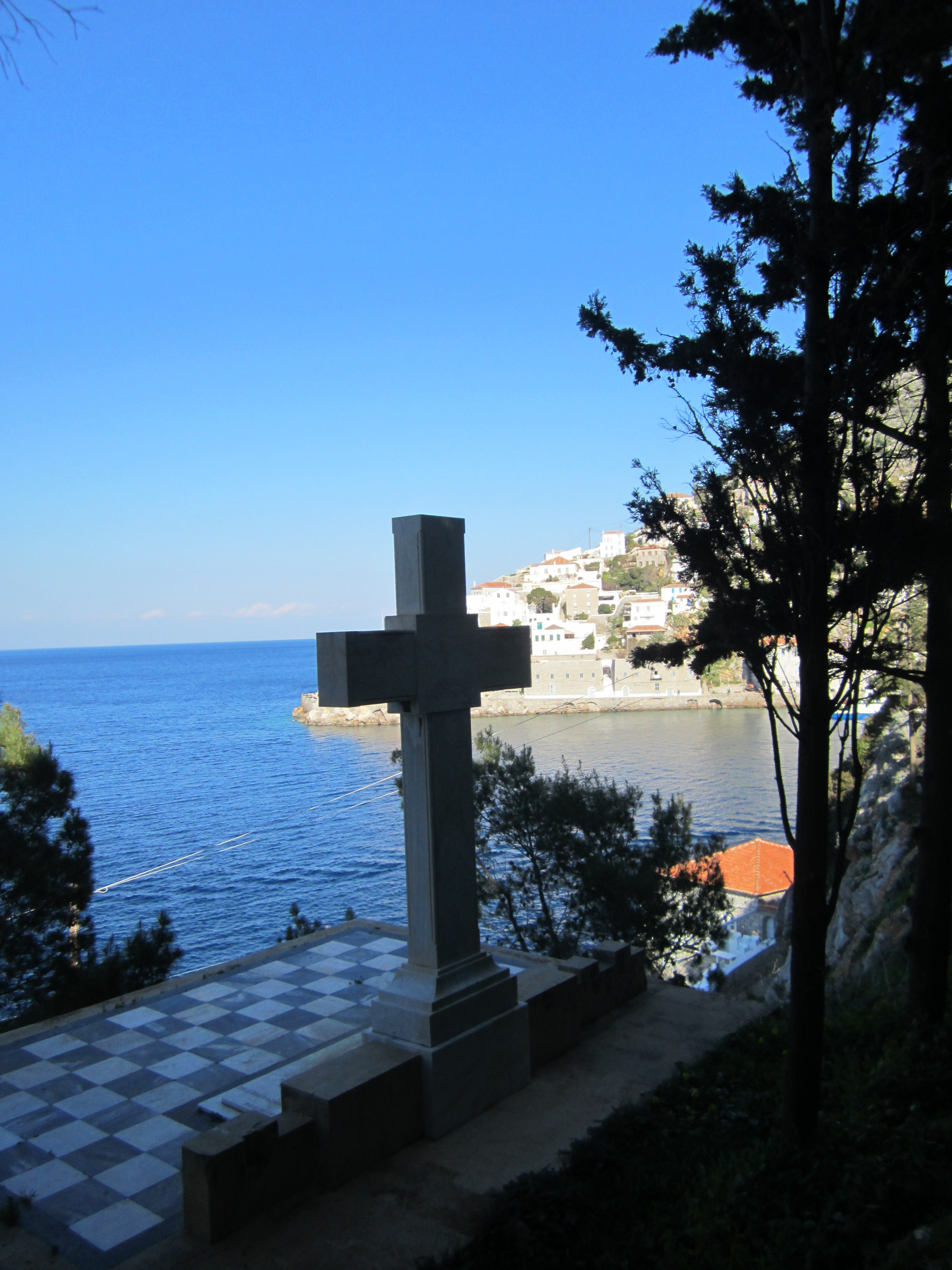
The cross on Kountouriotis's grave in Hydra

Admiral Pávlos Kountouriotis died in 1935. Α World War II Greek destroyer and a Standard-class frigate, Kountouriotis, are named after him.

One of the two gold 100 Euro coins issued by Greece in 2012 to commemorate the centenary of the Balkan Wars featured Kountouriotis and Georgios Averof.

== See also ==
- History of the Hellenic Navy

Political offices
New title Monarchy Abolished	President of Greece; 25 March 1924 – 6 April 1926	Succeeded by Theodoros Pangalos
Preceded by Theodoros Pangalos	President of Greece; 22 August 1926 – 10 December 1929	Succeeded by Alexandros Zaimis
