= USS St. Francis River =

1945 LSM(R)-501-class landing ship medium

USS St. Francis River (LSM(R)-525)
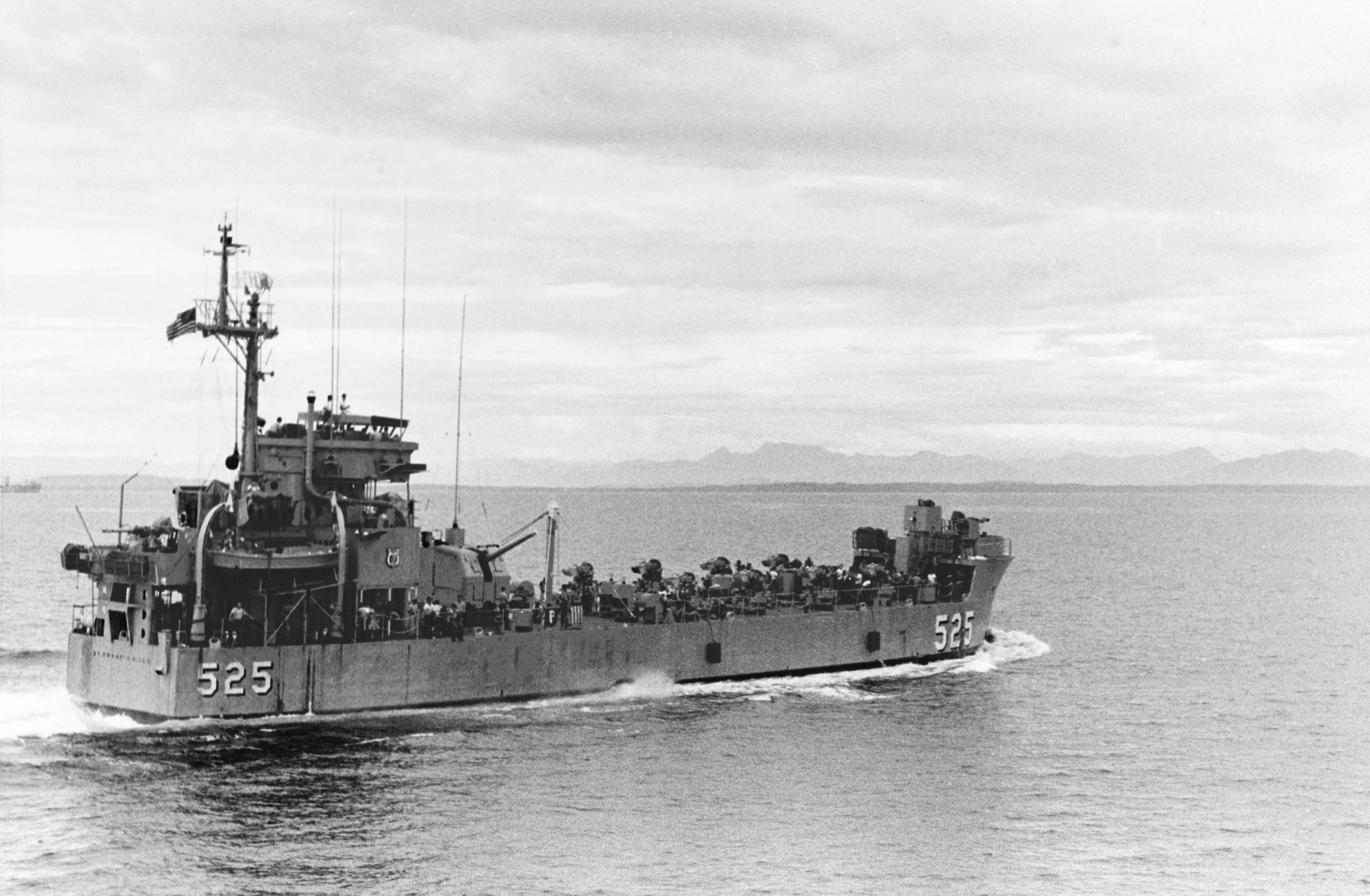
- USS St. Francis River (LSMR-525) in 1969

History

United States
- Name: LSM(R)-525 (14 August 1945 – 1 October 1955); St. Francis River (1 October 1955 –)
- Namesake: St. Francis River in Missouri and Arkansas; Saint Francis River in Maine
- Builder: Brown Shipbuilding Company
- Laid down: 19 May 1945
- Launched: 16 June 1945
- Commissioned: 14 August 1945 – 28 March 1946; 16 September 1950 – 21 November 1955; 18 September 1965 –
- Reclassified: LFR (1 January 1969)
- Stricken: 17 April 1970
- Fate: Sold for scrapping November 1970

General characteristics
- Class & type: LSM(R)-501-class landing ship medium (rocket)
- Displacement: 758 t.(light); 993 t. (attack); 1,175 t. (fully loaded)
- Length: 206 ft 3 in (62.87 m)
- Beam: 34 ft 6 in (10.52 m)
- Draft: 5 ft 4 in (1.63 m) (light); 6 ft 9 in (2.06 m) (attack); 7 ft 9 in (2.36 m) (fully loaded)
- Installed power: 2 × General Motors (non-reversing with airflex clutch) diesels
- Propulsion: Direct drive with 1,440 bhp (1,070 kW) each at 720rpm, twin screws
- Speed: 13 knots (24 km/h; 15 mph)
- Range: 3,000 mi (2,600 nmi; 4,800 km) at 13 knots (24 km/h; 15 mph)
- Complement: 6 officers, 137 enlisted
- Armament: 1 × 5 in (130 mm) dual purpose gun mount; 2 × twin 40 mm gun mounts; 4 × twin 20 mm gun mounts; 10 × twin continuous loading 5" SS rocket launchers; 4 × 4".2 mortars

USS St. Francis River (LSM(R)-525) was laid down on 19 May 1945 by the Brown Shipbuilding Company in Houston, Texas. She was launched on 16 June 1945, and commissioned on 14 August 1945 as USS LSM(R)-525. She was later renamed after rivers in Missouri, Arkansas, and Maine.

== Service history ==
After her shakedown, LSM(R)-525 was ordered to be inactivated, and reported to the Atlantic Reserve Fleet on 25 October 1945. She was decommissioned on 28 March 1946, and berthed at Green Cove Springs, Florida. The ship was activated after the outbreak of hostilities in Korea, and was recommissioned on 16 September 1950.

=== Korean War ===
LSM(R)-525 entered the Korean combat zone on 17 July 1951, firing rockets at enemy positions at Wonsan. Operating out of Japan, she continued to carry out fire support missions against Wonsan into the fall. In mid-December, she returned to San Diego and remained on the West Coast during 1952. Departing San Diego on 12 January 1953, she arrived off Korea on 24 March, and served as gunfire support ship for the defense of Sok To, an island off Korea's west coast, southwest of Pyongyang and Chinampo.

After the truce, she returned to San Diego, arriving on 28 August 1953. A year later, on 20 September 1954, she sailed west again for her first post-Korean War deployment. Routine operations took her into 1955; when, in February, she covered the evacuation of the Tachen Islands. Returning to the West Coast, LSM(R)-525 resumed 1st Fleet duties, and on 1 October, she was named USS St. Francis River, after rivers in Missouri, Arkansas, and Maine.

The ship was decommissioned on 21 November 1955, and entered the Pacific Reserve Fleet.

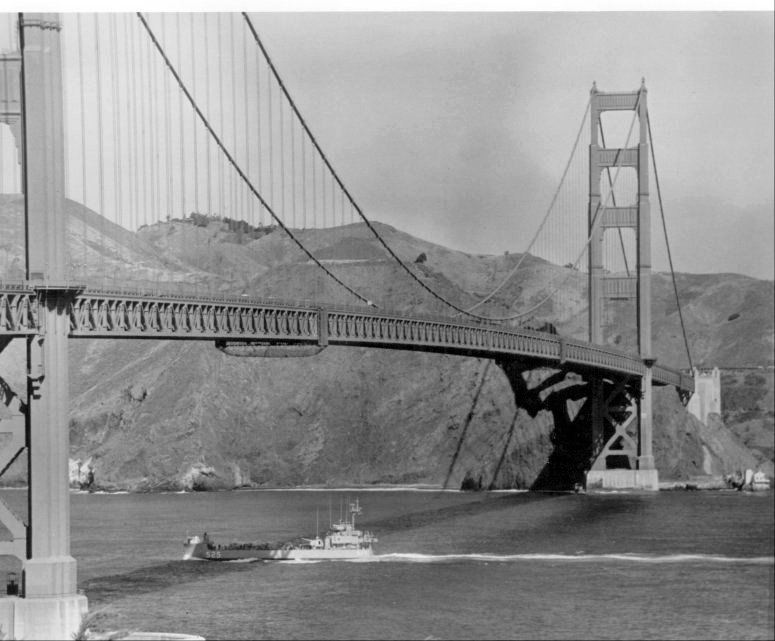
USS St. Francis River transiting under the Golden Gate Bridge during her sea trials following recommissioning in 1965

=== Vietnam ===
St. Francis River was recommissioned on 18 September 1965 at San Francisco. On 8 February 1966 she departed San Diego and sailed for her new homeport of Yokosuka, Japan. From Japan, she steamed south and arrived at Da Nang, South Vietnam, on 19 April, to begin operations in support of Allied forces fighting along the coast and in the Mekong Delta area. Rearmed regularly at Cam Rahn Bay and overhauled periodically at Yokosuka, St. Francis River provided rocket fire in support of Allied forces in South Vietnam from 1966 through 1969. During that period, her ability to coordinate her operations with the tactical situation ashore resulted in an impressive number of successful support missions.

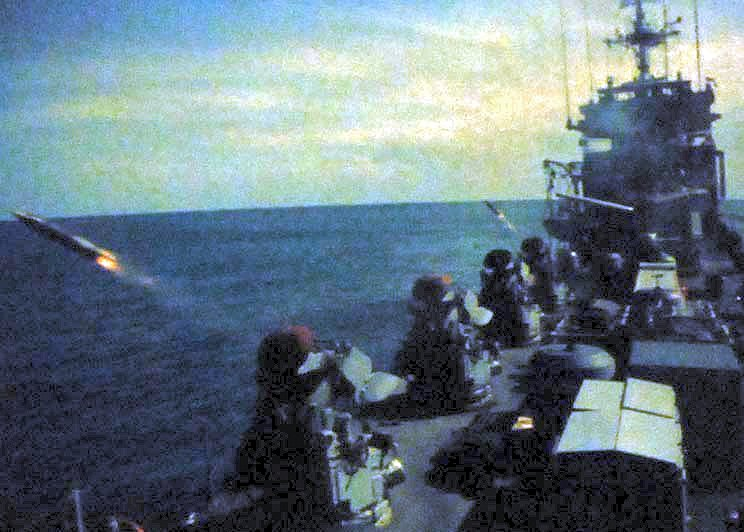
USS St. Francis River a pair of rockets toward enemy positions near Chu Lai, Vietnam in 1966

== Final disposal ==
Reclassified as LFR-525 on 1 January 1969, St. Francis River was decommissioned and stricken from the Navy list on 17 April 1970. She was sold in November 1970 to Nissho-Iwai American Corp., Sasebo, Japan, for scrapping.

== Honors and awards ==
LSM(R)-525 received three battle stars for Korean service and St. Francis River received ten campaign stars for Vietnam service.
