= List of Albanians in Greece =

This is a list of Albanians in Greece that includes both Greek people of Albanian descent and Albanian immigrants that have resided in Greece. The list is sorted by the fields or occupations in which the notable individual has maintained the most influence.

For inclusion in this list, each individual must have a Wikipedia article indicating notability and show that they are Albanian and have lived in Greece.

== History and politics ==
- John Spata – Albanian ruler
- Yaqub Spata – Lord of Arta
- Irene Shpata - Despotess of Ioannina, married to Esau de' Buondelmonti
- Ahmed Dino – military leader and politician
- Ali Dino – famous Albanian cartoonist and member of the Hellenic Parliament
- Abedin Dino - one of the League of Prizren founders and an important figure of the Albanian National Awakening
- Hamdi Çami - Deputy of Preveza
- Georgios Kountouriotis – Hydriote ship-owner and politician
- Antonios Kriezis - Greek captain of the Hellenic navy during the Greek War of Independence and a Prime Minister of Greece from 1849 to 1854.
- Alexandros Diomidis - governor of the Central Bank of Greece who became Prime Minister of Greece.
- Diomidis Kyriakos - Greek author, politician and Prime Minister of Greece.
- Athanasios Miaoulis - Greek military officer and Prime Minister of Greece
- Pavlos Kountouriotis - first President of the Second Hellenic Republic.
- Dimitrios Voulgaris- Greek revolutionary fighter during the Greek War of Independence of 1821, eight-time Prime Minister of Greece.
- Petros Voulgaris- Greek Admiral who served as Prime Minister of Greece in 1945.
- Theodoros Pangalos - Greek general, politician and dictator.
- Emmanouil Repoulis - Greek politician and journalist, and Deputy Prime Minister of Greece (1919–1920).
- Alexandros Koryzis- Greek politician who was Prime Minister of Greece briefly in 1941
- Ioannis Orlandos- Greek politician and revolutionary.
- Antonios Miaoulis - Greek politician and a revolutionary leader during the Greek War of Independence.
- Lazaros Kountouriotis - Greek Senator and major actor of the Greek War of Independence of 1821.
- Athanasios N. Miaoulis - Greek naval officer and politician
- Spyridon Mercouris - Greek politician and long-serving mayor of Athens in the early 20th century.
- George S. Mercouris - Greek politician who served as a Member of Parliament and Cabinet Minister, founder of the Greek National Socialist Party
- Stamatis Merkouris - Greek Army officer and politician, who served as an MP and a Cabinet Minister.
- Maurice Spata – Ruler of Arta
- Rasih Dino - Diplomat and signatory of Albania to the Treaty of London
- Kitsos Tzavellas - Greek fighter in the Greek War of Independence and later Hellenic Army General and Prime Minister of Greece.
- Katerina Botsari - Greek courtier.
- Photini Tzavela - Greek courtier.
- Mid’hat Frashëri - Albanian diplomat, writer and politician
- Shahin Dino - Deputy of the sanjak of Preveza in the Ottoman Parliament and later Minister of Interior of Albania
- Jakup Veseli - from Margariti, representative of Chameria in Vlora Congress, signatory of Albanian Declaration of Independence.
- Osman Taka - well-known dancer of his time
- Sgouros Spata - Albanian ruler
- Niazi Demi - Minister of trade of Albania.
- Rexhep Demi - From Filiates, representative of Chameria in Vlora Congress, signatory of Albanian Declaration of Independence.
- Thoma Çami - Founder and chairman of organisation "Bashkimi", the best-known cultural club, of Rilindja Kombëtare
- Veli Gërra - Representative of Chameria in Vlora Congress, signatory of Albanian Declaration of Independence
- Refo Çapari - Albanian politician and religious leader
- Hamdi Bey - Ottoman officer and politician
- Omer Fortuzi - Albanian politician and mayor of Tirana from 1940 through 1943.
- Xhemil Dino - Albanian politician and diplomat
- Mehmed Konica - Albanian politician. He served three times as the Foreign Minister of Albania
- Hatzigiannis Mexis - Arvanite Albanian governor and shipowner.
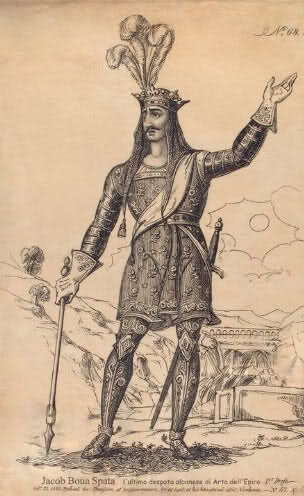
Yaqub Spata

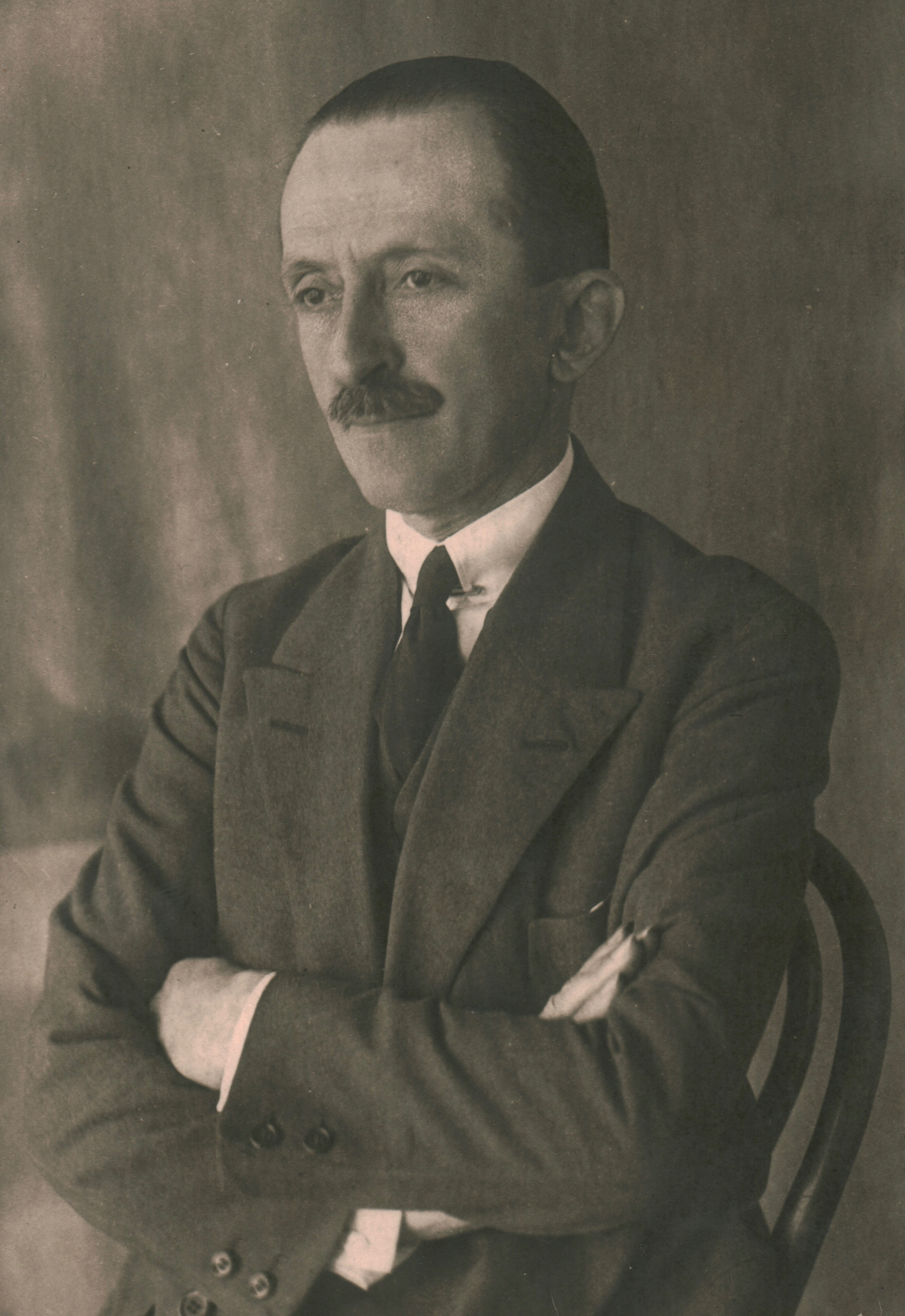
Mehmed Konica

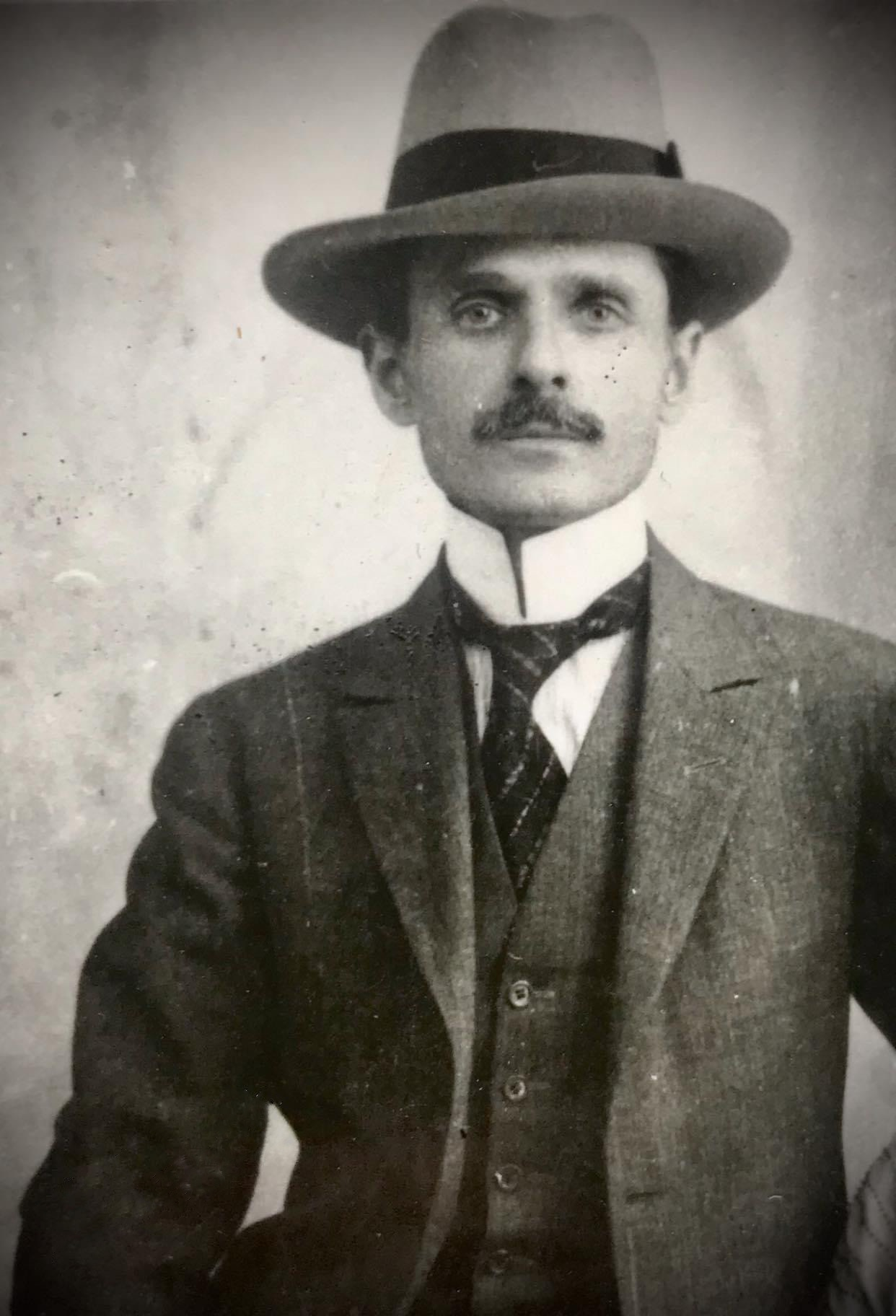
Mid'hat Frashëri

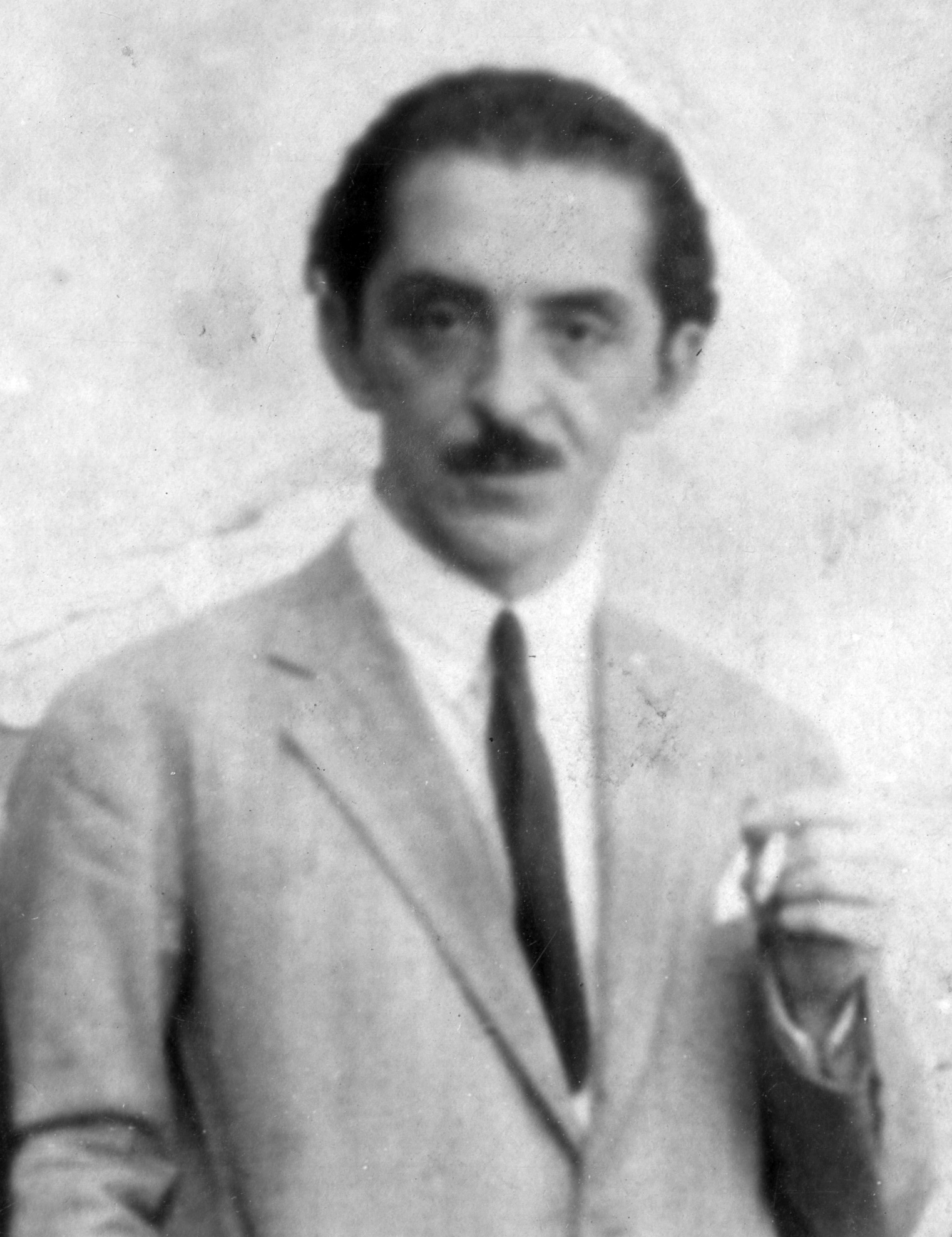
Ali Dino

== Military ==
- Ali Pasha of Ioannina - Albanian ruler who served as pasha of a large part of western Rumelia.
- Veli Pasha - Pasha of the Morea Eyalet.
- Thopia Zenevisi – 14th century Anti Ottoman rebellion leader
- Yakup Ağa – Ottoman Sipahi of Albanian or Turkish descent
- Manuel Bokali – military commander
- Petros Lantzas - Corfiot Greek, spy, privateer and pirate
- Emmanuel Mormoris - Cretan military commander and notable political figure in the Republic of Venice.
- Murat Reis the Elder - Ottoman privateer and admiral.
- Hayreddin Barbarossa – Greek-Albanian or Greek-Turkish corsair and later admiral of the Ottoman Navy
- Demitre - Albanian count in the Catalan dominions in late-14th-century Thessaly.
- David Arianites - high-ranking Byzantine commander of the early 11th century.
- Peter Losha - Albanian clan leader in medieval Epirus.
- Mercurio Bua – Commander of the Venetian army
- Oruç Reis – Greek-Albanian or Greek-Turkish Ottoman bey and admiral
- Murat Reis the Elder – Ottoman privateer and admiral
- Hasan Tahsin Pasha – Ottoman military officer
- Mehmet Esat Bülkat – Ottoman general
- Wehib Pasha – military officer
- Hasan Rami Pasha – Ottoman career officer
- Spiro Bellkameni – Albanian military commander
- Georgios Drakos - Greek general and fighter of the Greek War of Independence.
- Markos Drakos - Lieutenant General of the Hellenic Army most notable for his leadership during the Greco-Italian War of 1940–41.
- Kostas Botsaris - Greek general and senator.
- Notis Botsaris - Greek general and leader of the Botsari clan.
- Tousias Botsaris - Greek commander and fighter of the Greek War of Independence.
- Dimitrios Botsaris - Greek Army officer and Minister for Military Affairs.
- Kitsos Botsaris leader of the Souliotes.
- Vasilios Lazarou - Spetsiote shipowner, fighter of the Greek War of Independence and politician.
- Giotis Danglis Greek leader of the Greek revolutionary army during the Greek War of Independence.
- Panagiotis Danglis - Greek Army general and politician.
- Lambros Koutsonikas - Greek general and fighter of the Greek Revolution of 1821.
- Lambros Tzavelas - leader of the Souliotes.
- Gardikiotis Grivas, Greek revolutionary in the Greek War of Independence.
- Moscho Tzavela - Greek heroine of the years before the outbreak of the Greek War of Independence,
- Nikolaos Zervas - Greek revolutionary and Army general.
- Ali Demi – World War II hero of Albania born in Filiates, Greece in 1918, and died during a battle with Axis forces in Vlora, Albania in 1943. After him was created the first Cham battalion in ELAS army, the battalion "Ali Demi"
- Musa Demi – Revolutionary and important figure of the Albanian National Awakening
- Aziz Çami – Officer of the Albanian army and Balli Kombëtar commander
- Laskarina Bouboulina - Greek naval commander, heroine of the Greek War of Independence in 1821, and considered the first woman to attain the rank of admiral.
- Dimitris Plapoutas - Greek general who fought during the Greek War of Independence against the rule of the Ottoman Empire.
- Andreas Miaoulis - Greek revolutionary, admiral, and politician
- Odysseas Androutsos - Greek military and political commander in eastern mainland Greece
- Dimitrios Kriezis - Greek naval officer.
- Alexandros Kontoulis - Greek Army officer who rose to the rank of Lieutenant General.
- Dimitrios Miaoulis - Greek revolutionary leader
- Sofoklis Dousmanis - Greek naval officer, twice chief of the Greek Navy General Staff, and occupant of the post of Minister for Naval Affairs in 1935.
- Viktor Dousmanis - Greek Army officer, who rose to the rank of Lieutenant General.
- Nikolaos Votsis - Greek naval officer who distinguished himself during the Balkan Wars and rose to the rank of Rear Admiral.
- Emmanouil Miaoulis - Greek naval officer.
- Meletis Vasileiou - leader in the Greek War of Independence who contributed to the organization of the revolutionary forces in Attica.
- Emmanouil A. Miaoulis - Greek naval officer active during the first decades of the existence of the Royal Hellenic Navy.
- Nikolaos Miaoulis - Greek navy personnel, aide-de-camp to Otto of Greece until his abdication.
- Anastasios Tsamados - Greek admiral of the Greek War of Independence.
- Andreas D. Miaoulis - Greek naval officer, Minister of Naval Affairs in 1020
- Ioannis A. Miaoulis - Greek naval officer.
- Nikolaos Kriezotis - Greek leader in Eboea during the Greek War of Independence.
- Ioannis Miaoulis - Greek naval officer.
- Georgios Sachtouris - Hydriot ship captain and a leading admiral of the Greek War of Independence.
- Iakovos Tombazis - merchant and ship-owner from Hydra who became the first Admiral of the Greek Navy during the Greek War of Independence
- Andreas D. Vokos - Greek naval officer.
- Emmanouil Tombazis - Greek naval captain from Hydra, active during the Greek War of Independence.
- Andreas A. Miaoulis - Greek naval officer, grandson of Andreas Miaoulis, the celebrated admiral of the Greek War of Independence.
- Dimitrios D. Miaoulis - Greek naval officer, son of Dimitrios Miaoulis.
- Markos Botsaris - Greek hero of the Greek War of Independence and chieftain of the Souliotes.
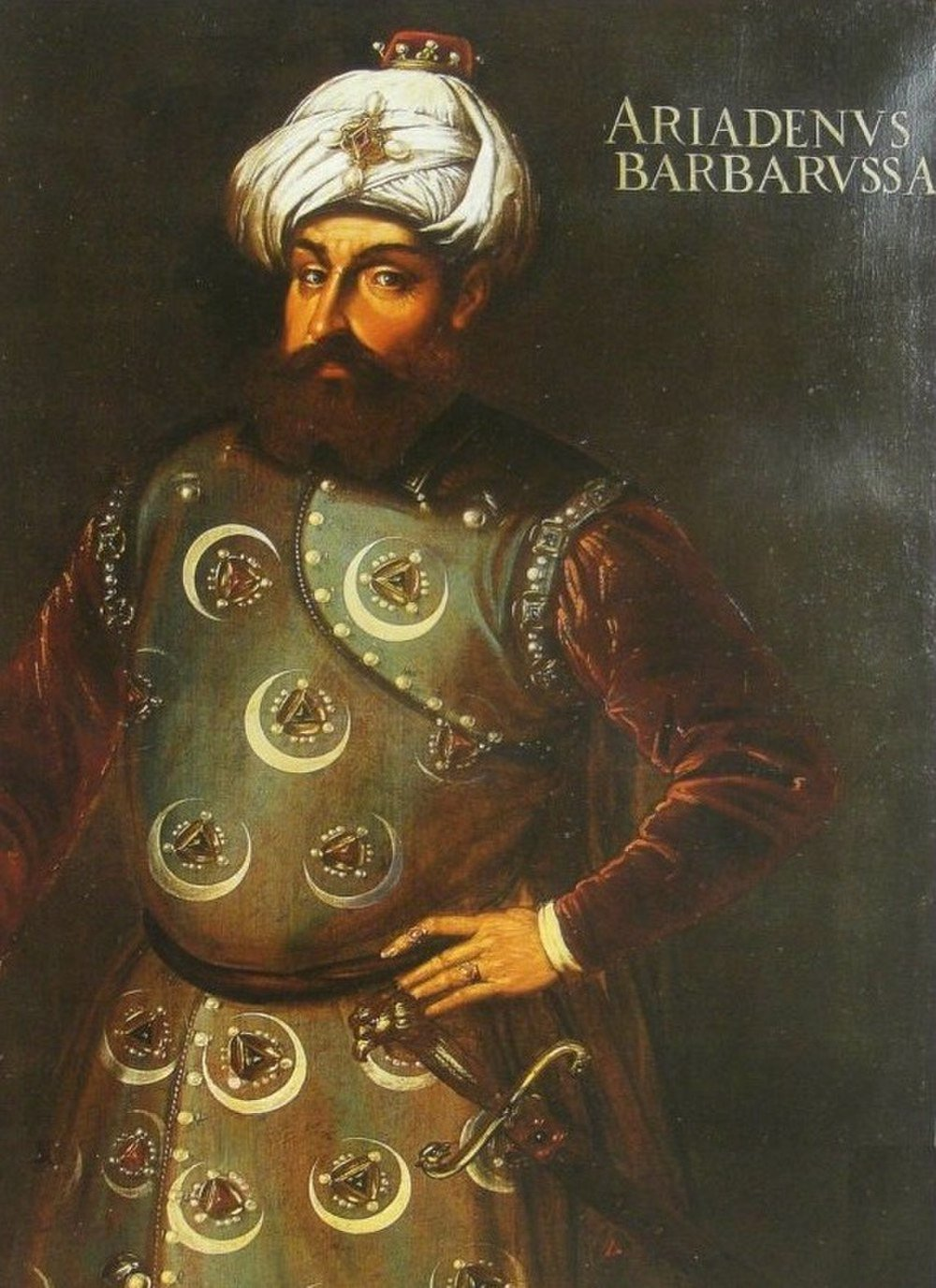
Hayreddin Barbarossa

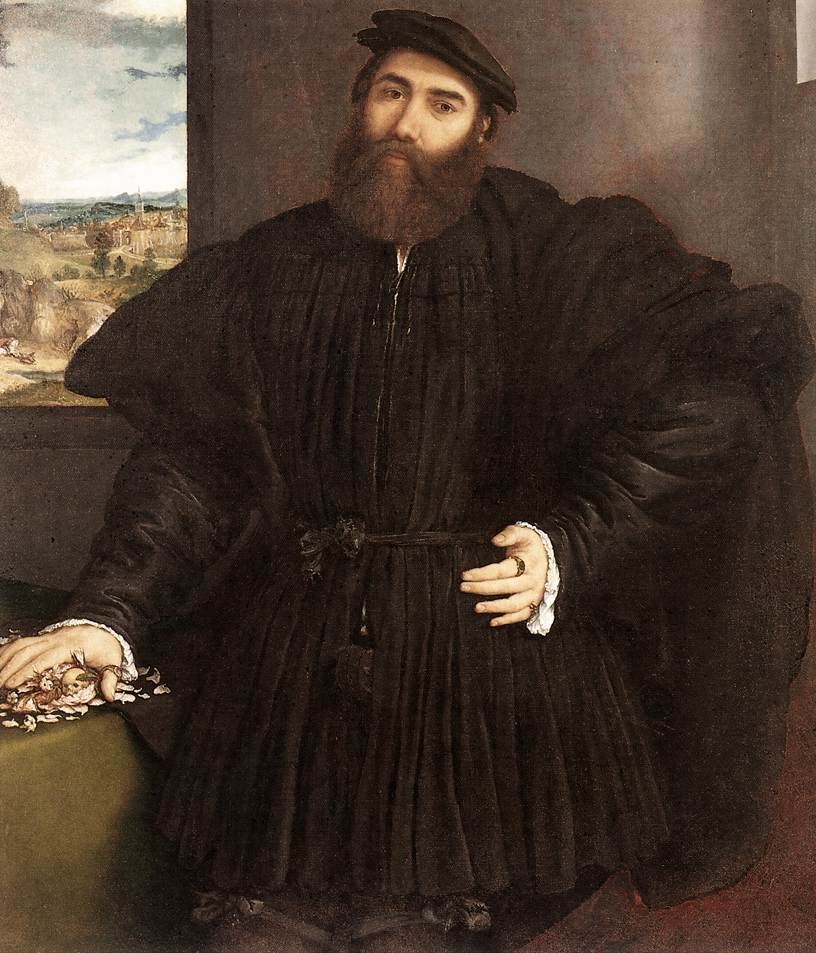
Mercurio Bua

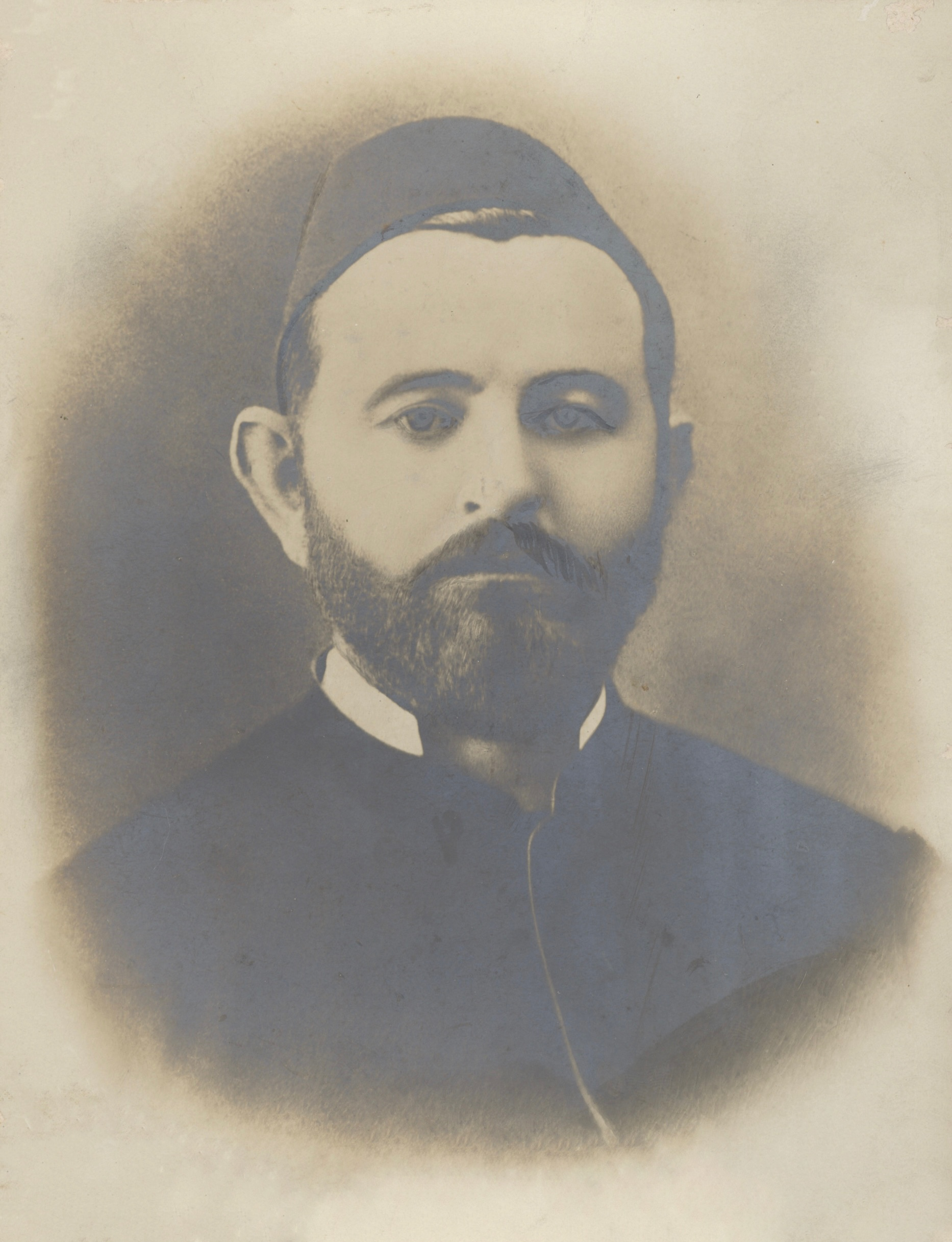
Abedin Dino

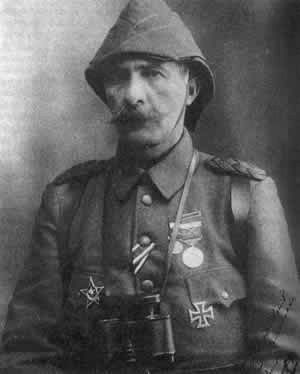
Mehmet Esat Bülkat

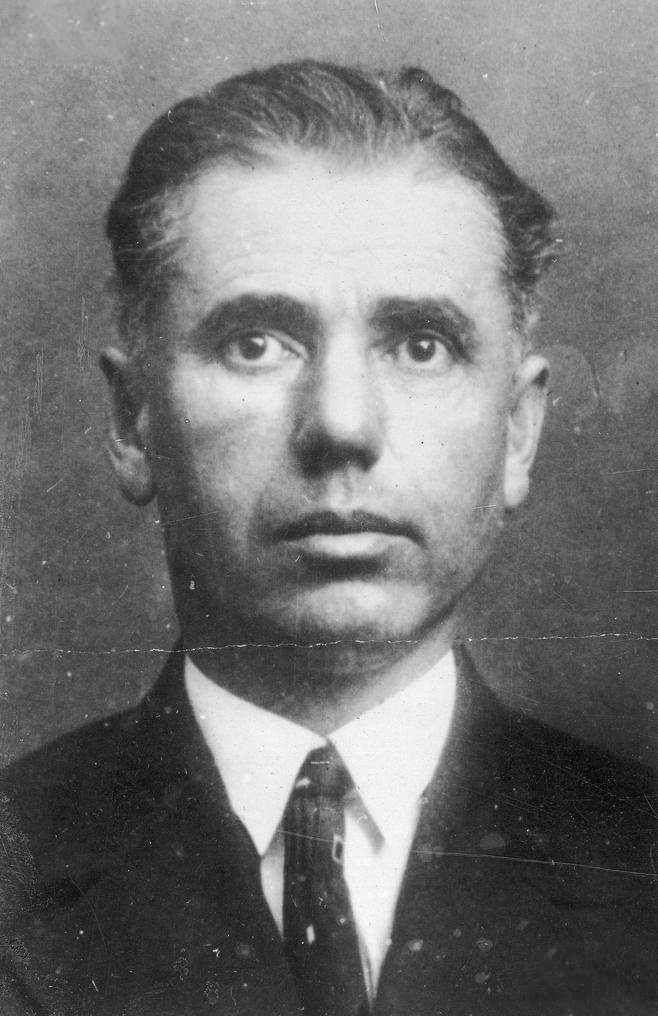
Aziz Çami

== Religion ==
- Nephon II of Constantinople – Greek-Albanian Ecumenical Patriarch of Constantinople
- Kristo Negovani - Albanian nationalist figure, religious leader and writer
- Athenagoras I of Constantinople - Greek archbishop in North America
- Ieronymos II of Athens - Archbishop of Athens and All Greece and the primate of the Autocephalous Orthodox Church of Greece.
- Eulogios Kourilas Lauriotis - bishop of the Orthodox Autocephalous Church of Albania.

== Academia ==
- Anastas Kullurioti, writer and Albanian rights activist.
- Panayotis Koupitoris – Arvanite Greek writer
- Faik Konica - Albanian writer
- Onufri - 16th century painter of Orthodox icons and Archpriest of Elbasan.
- Nicholas Leonicus Thomaeus - was a Venetian scholar and professor of philosophy at the University of Padua.
- Vangelis Liapis - Greek scholar and folklorist.
- Anastas Byku - Albanian publisher and journalist.
- Aristeidis Kollias - Greek lawyer, publicist, historian and folklorist.
- Ioannis Altamouras – Greek painter of the 19th century famous for his paintings of seascapes
- Bilal Xhaferi – Albanian poet and novelist, and a political dissident
- Qamil Çami - Teacher and poet of era of the Albanian National Awakening
- Eleni Boukoura-Altamoura - Greek painter, noted as being the first great female painter of Greece.
- Gerasimos Vokos- Greek scholar, writer, painter, and journalist.
- Nikolaos Vokos- Greek painter of the Munich School art movement.
- Andreas Kriezis- Greek painter, primarily of portraits and maritime subjects.
- Anastasios Orlandos - Greek architect and historian of architecture.
- Tasos Neroutsos - Greek physician and scholar.
- Alexandros Pallis - Greek educational and language reformer who translated the New Testament into Modern Greek.
- Marco Pallis - Greek-British author and mountaineer.
- Marietta Pallis - Greek-Briton ecologist and botanical artist.
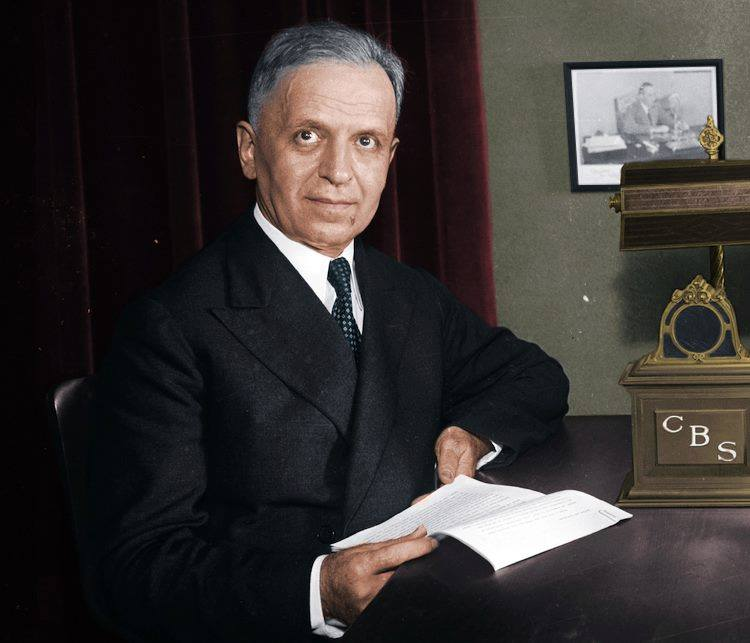
Faik Konica

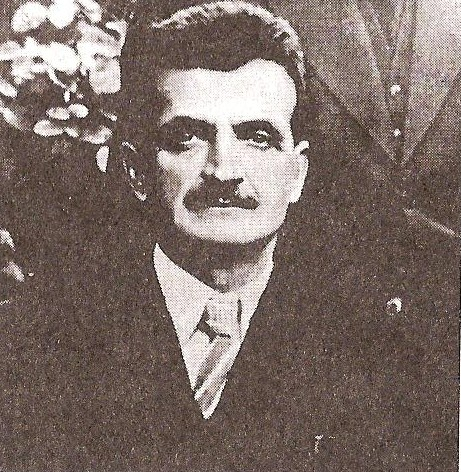
Qamil Çami

== Cinema ==
- Laert Vasili – Greek-Albanian actor and director.
- Neritan Zinxhiria – Greek-Albanian filmmaker
- Jon Lolis – Greek actor

== Music ==
- Claydee – Greek-Albanian music artist, producer, songwriter and music executive
- Eleni Foureira – Greek singer and dancer
- Sin Boy – Greek–Albanian rapper
- Toquel – Greek rapper
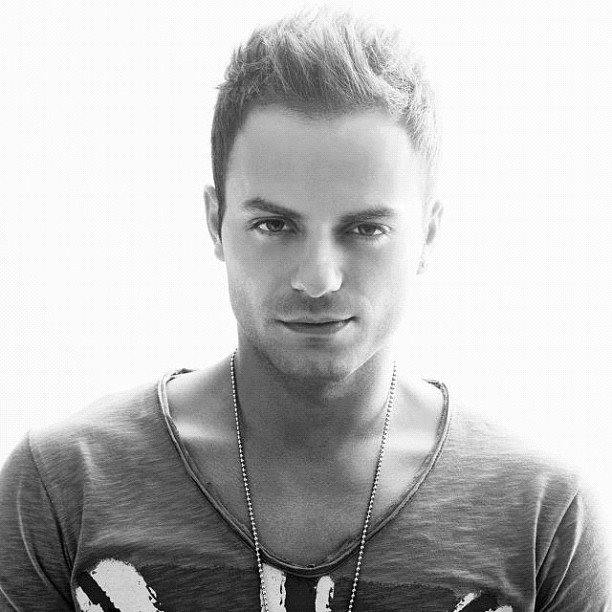
Claydee

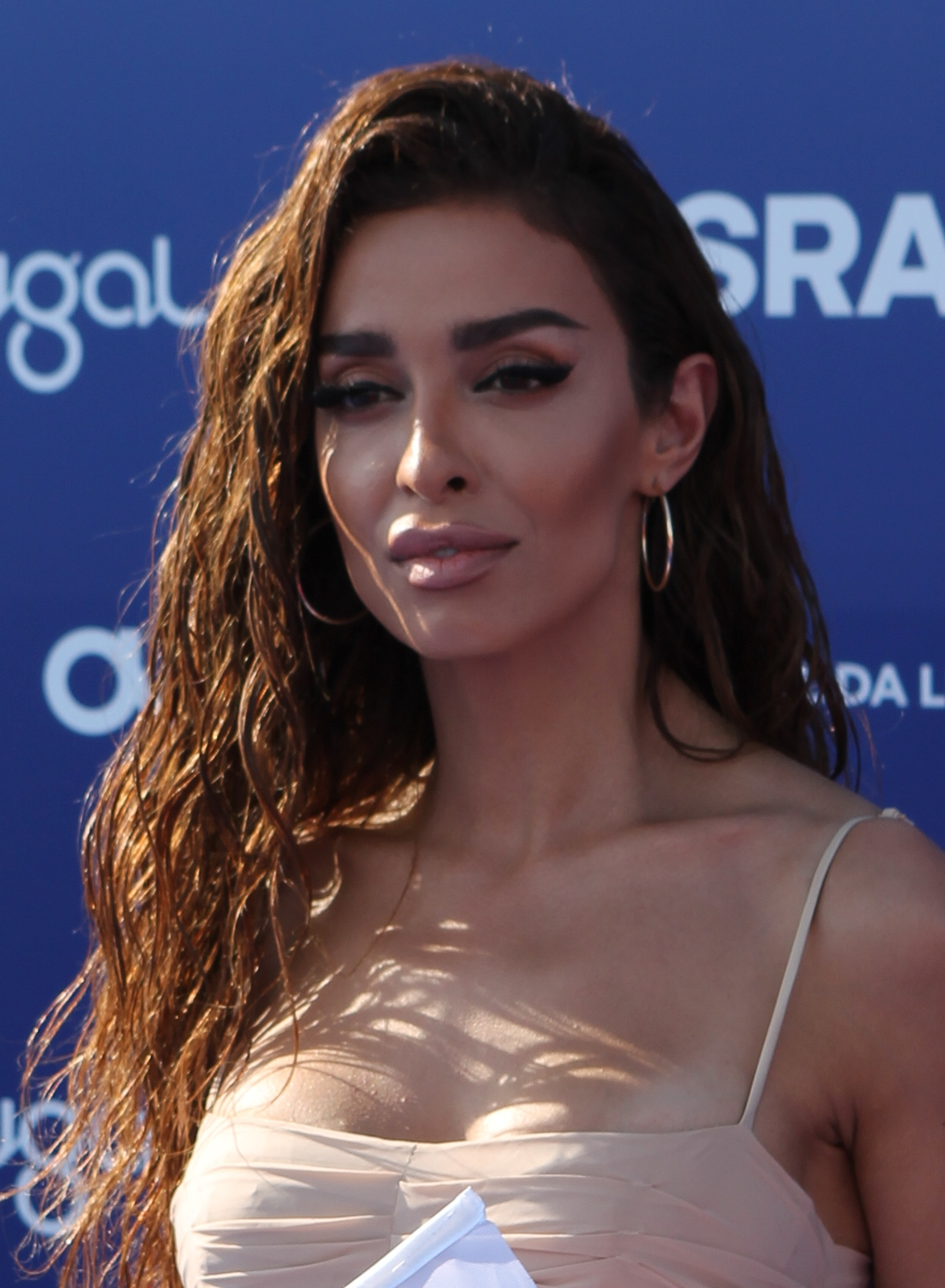
Eleni Foureira

== Sports ==
- Thomas Strakosha – Albanian professional footballer who plays as a goalkeeper for the Albania national team and Greek Superleague team AEK Athens.
- Enea Mihaj – Albanian professional footballer
- Ilir Kastrati - Albanian footballer
- Kristo Shehu - Albanian professional footballer
- Fatjon Andoni – footballer
- Damian Gjini – footballer
- Vasil Shkurti – Albanian professional footballer
- Fiorin Durmishaj – footballer
- Areta Konomi – Greek former professional volleyball player
- Marios Vrousai – Greek professional footballer
- Anestis Nastos – footballer
- Albi Alla - Albanian professional footballer.
- Donald Açka – footballer
- Maldin Ymeraj - Albanian professional footballer.
- Myrto Uzuni - Albanian professional footballer.
- Ermal Tahiri - Albanian retired footballer.
- Simo Rrumbullaku - Albanian professional footballer.
- Andi Renja - Albanian footballer.
- Orestis Menka - Albanian footballer.
- Panagiotis Kone - Greek professional footballer for the Greece national team
- Mihal Thano – Greek–born Albanian footballer
- Giorgos Kakko – Albanian-born Greek footballer
- Emiljano Shehu – footballer
- Erind Prifti – footballer
- Neti Meçe - footballer
- Mirela Maniani - footballer
- Qazim Laçi - footballer
- Kristian Kushta - footballer
- Enea Koliçi - Albanian professional footballer
- Bledar Kola - footballer
- Jani Kaçi - footballer
- Ergys Kaçe - footballer
- Gertin Hoxhalli - footballer
- Klodian Gino - footballer
- Enea Gaqollari - footballer
- Bledi Muca – Greek professional footballer
- Lefter Millo – Albanian professional footballer
- Ardit Toli – Albanian footballer
- Savva Lika – retired javelin thrower who represented Greece
- Alexandros Bimai – Greek footballer
- Jorgo Meksi – Albanian footballer
- Lazaros Rota – Greek footballer
- Angelo Tafa – Albanian footballer
- Kosta Vangjeli – Greek-born Albanian footballer
- Andreas Ntoi – Greek footballer
- Elina Tzengko — Greek javelin thrower
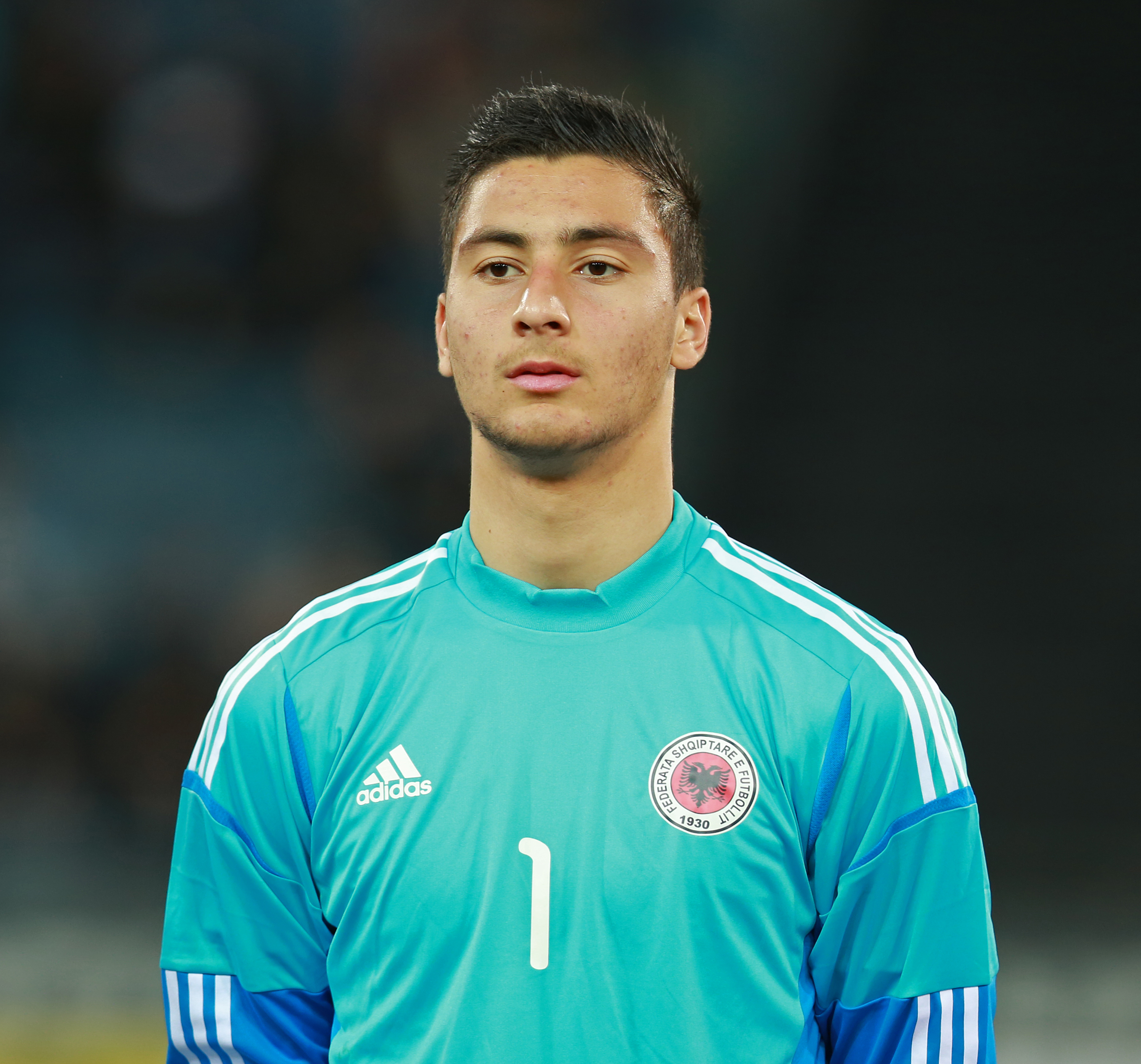
Thomas Strakosha

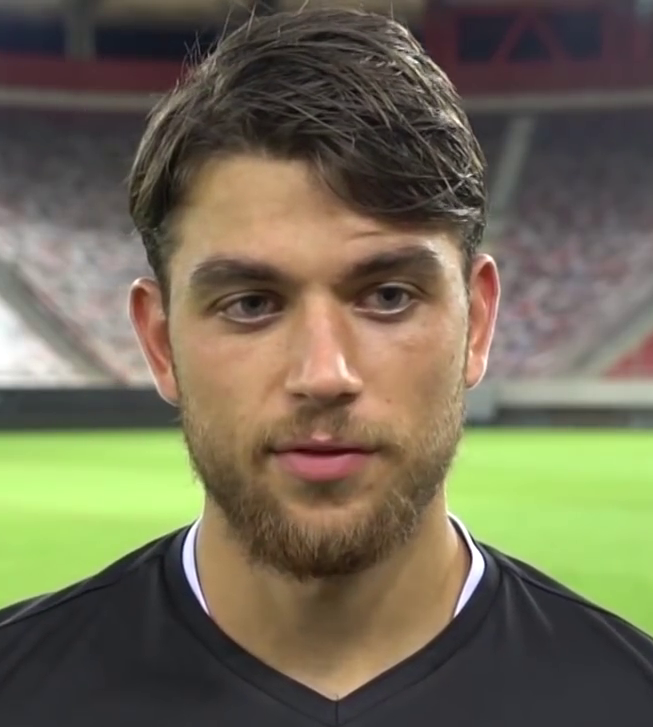
Enea Mihaj

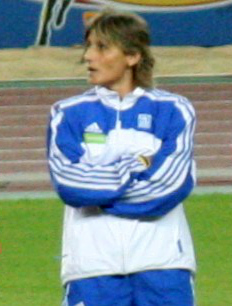
Savva Lika

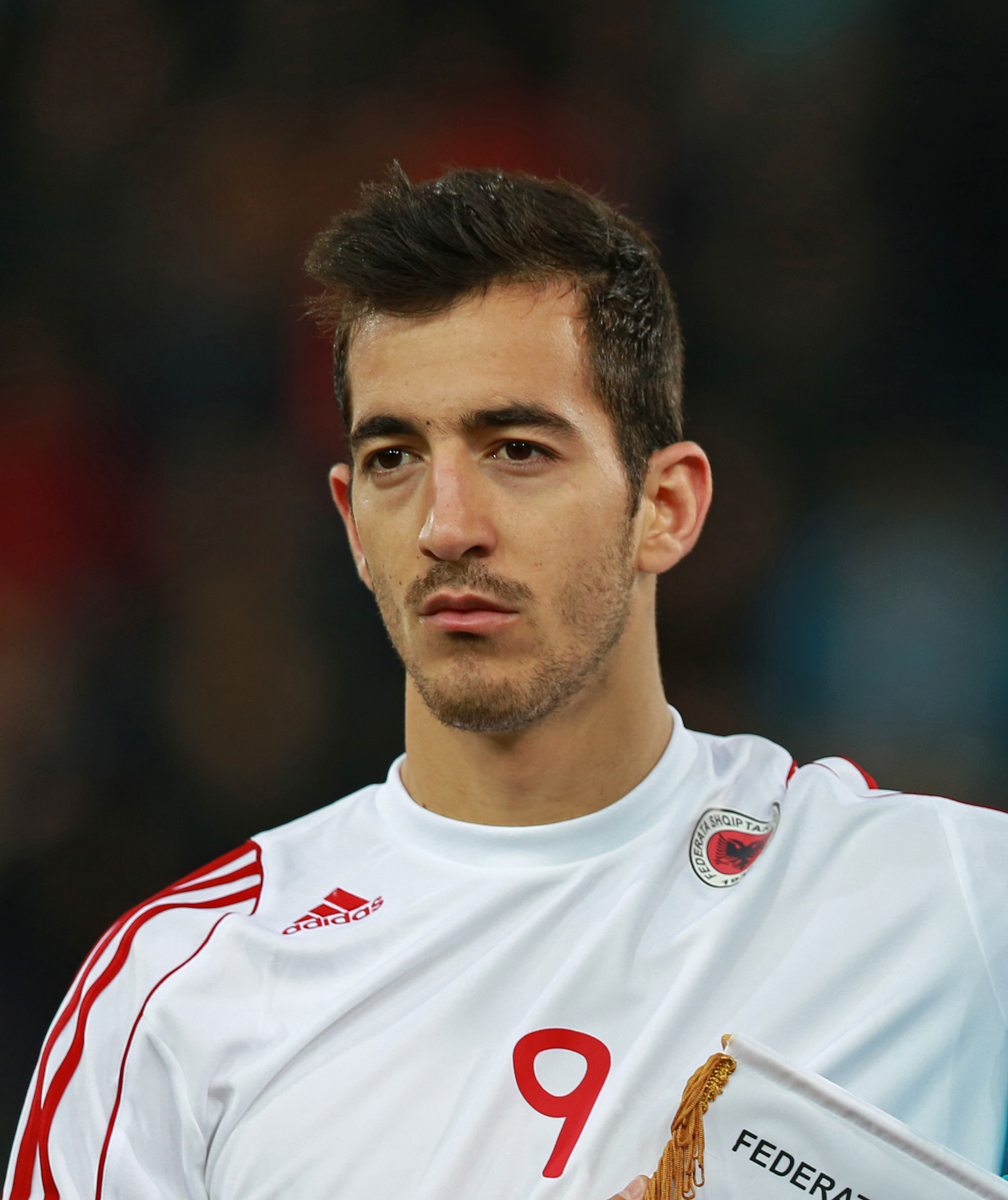
Vasil Shkurti

== Sources ==
- Floristán, José M. (2019). "Stradioti albanesi al servizio degli Asburgo di Spagna (I): le famiglie albanesi Bua, Crescia e Renesi". Shêjzat – Pleiades (1–2).
- Gramaticopolo, Andrea (2016). Stradioti: alba, fortuna e tramonto dei mercenari greco-albanesi al servizio della Serenissima (in Italian). Soldiershop Publishing. ISBN 9788893270489.
- Hammond, Nicholas Geoffrey Lemprière (1976). Migrations and invasions in Greece and adjacent areas. Noyes Press. ISBN 978-0-8155-5047-1.
- Madgearu, Alexandru; Gordon, Martin (2008). The Wars of the Balkan Peninsula: Their Medieval Origins. Scarecrow Press. ISBN 978-0-8108-5846-6.
- Nicol, Donald MacGillivray (2010). The Despotate of Epiros 1267–1479: A Contribution to the History of Greece in the Middle Ages. Cambridge: Cambridge University Press. ISBN 978-0-521-13089-9.
- Trapp, Erich; Beyer, Hans-Veit; Walther, Rainer; Sturm-Schnabl, Katja; Kislinger, Ewald; Leontiadis, Ioannis; Kaplaneres, Sokrates (1976–1996). Prosopographisches Lexikon der Palaiologenzeit (in German). Vienna: Verlag der Österreichischen Akademie der Wissenschaften. ISBN 3-7001-3003-1.
