= Miaoulis =

Miaoulis (Greek: Μιαούλης) may refer to:

== People with the surname ==
- Andreas Vokos Miaoulis (1769–1835), Greek admiral and politician
- Dimitrios Miaoulis (1784–1836), son of Andreas
- Antonios Miaoulis (1800–1836), son of Andreas
- Ioannis Miaoulis (1803–1830), brother of Andreas
- Emmanouil Miaoulis (1812–1871), brother of Andreas
- Athanasios Miaoulis (1815–1867), brother of Andreas
- Nikolaos Miaoulis (1818–1872), brother of Andreas
- Andreas Miaoulis (born 1819) (1819–1887), son of Dimitrios
- Dimitrios D. Miaoulis (1836–1899), son of Dimitrios
- Emmanouil A. Miaoulis, son of Antonios
- Andreas A. Miaoulis (1830–?), son of Antonios
- Nikolaos Vokos (1854–1902), son of Emmanouil
- Ioannis A. Miaoulis (1850–1913), son of Andreas D. Miaoulis
- Athanasios N. Miaoulis (1865–1936), son of Nikolaos D. Miaoulis
- Andreas Miaoulis (born 1869) (1869–?), son of Dimitrios D. Miaoulis

== Other ==
- Miaoulis (cannonade), a gunboat of the Royal Greek Navy
- Greek cruiser Navarchos Miaoulis, an 1879 cruiser of the Royal Greek Navy
- Greek destroyer Miaoulis (L91), a World War II-era destroyer of the Greek Navy
- Greek destroyer Miaoulis (D-211), a Greek Gearing-class destroyer
- Akti Miaouli, an area of the Port of Piraeus
- Miaoulis (shoal), a shoal in the Ionian Sea
