= Andreas Miaoulis (disambiguation) =

Andreas Vokos Miaoulis (1768-1835) was Hydriot admiral-in-chief of the Greek navy in the Greek War of Independence.

Andreas Miaoulis may also refer to:

- Andreas Miaoulis (born 1819) (1819–1887), grandson of the above, Greek naval officer
- Andreas A. Miaoulis (1830–?), Greek naval officer and hydrographer
- Andreas Miaoulis (born 1869) (1869–?), great-grandson of Andreas Vokos Miaoulis, Greek naval officer
- Andreas Miaoulis (basketball) (1938–2010), commissioner of Hellenic Basketball Federation
