= Admiral Miaoulis =

Admiral Miaoulis can refer to:

- Andreas Miaoulis (1765 – 24 June 1835), admiral of the Greek fleet during the Greek War of Independence
- Andreas Miaoulis (born 1869), Greek vice admiral and politician
- Ioannis A. Miaoulis (1850–1913), Greek rear admiral
