= Greek ship Miaoulis =

At least three ships of the Hellenic Navy have borne the name Miaoulis (Greek: Μιαούλης) or Navarchos Miaoulis (Ναύαρχος Μιαούλης, "Admiral Miaoulis") after Greek naval hero Andreas Miaoulis:

- Greek cruiser Navarchos Miaoulis, a cruiser launched in 1879 and scrapped in 1931.
- Greek destroyer Miaoulis (L91), a Hunt-class destroyer launched in 1942 as HMS Modbury but transferred to Greece and renamed before completion. She was returned to the Royal Navy in 1959 and scrapped in 1960.
- Greek destroyer Miaoulis (D211), an Allen M. Sumner-class destroyer launched in 1944 as USS Ingraham she was transferred to Greece in 1971 and renamed. She was sunk as a target in 2001.
