= Greek frigate Hellas =

Flagship of the Revolutionary Hellenic Navy (in service 1825–31)

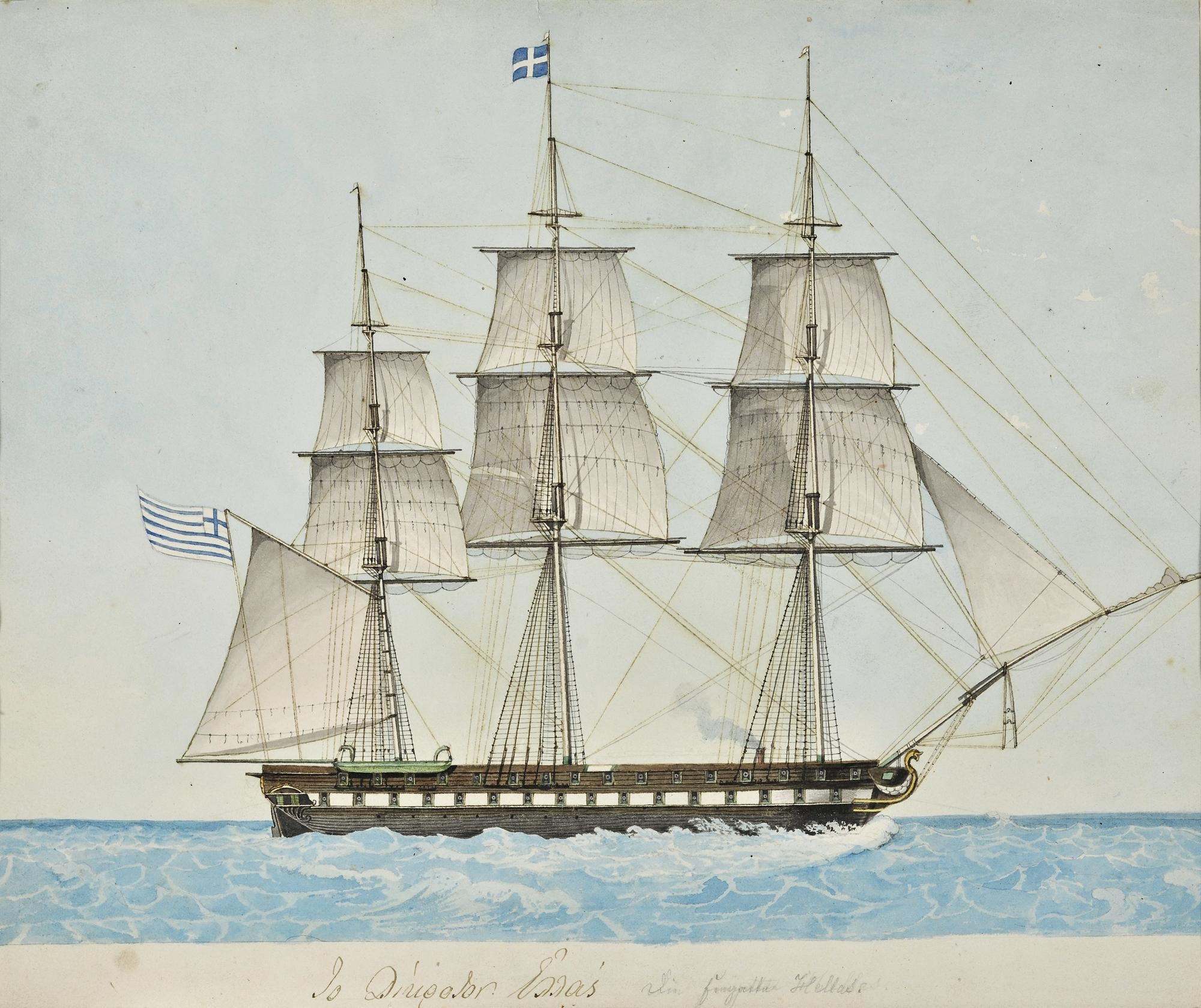
- The frigate Hellas

History

Greece
- Namesake: Hellas
- Laid down: 1825
- Launched: 1826
- Acquired: 1825
- Commissioned: 1826
- Decommissioned: 1831
- Fate: Burned by Admiral Andreas Miaoulis
- Notes: Previously Frigate Hope

General characteristics
- Propulsion: sail

The Greek frigate Hellas (Greek: Ελλάς) was the flagship of the Revolutionary Hellenic Navy. After an arbitration hearing in New York due to financial default by the Greek government, she was delivered to Greece in 1826. She was burned in 1831 by the Greek Admiral Andreas Miaoulis when the government of Ioannis Kapodistrias ordered her turned over to the Russian navy.

== Two ships ordered ==
In 1825, during the latter part of the Greek War of Independence from the Ottoman Empire, representatives of the Greek government in London negotiated with an American shipyard in New York City for the construction of two frigates to be named Hope and Liberator. Ultimately, the Greek government defaulted and one of the ships, (Liberator) was sold and the proceeds were used to pay for the other ship to be delivered to Greece.

== The frigate Hellas ==
The Hope sailed from New York during the first days of October 1826, with the crew being mostly adventurers. An agent of the Greek government, K. A. Kontostavlos, was also on board.

The voyage was raucous as the crew attempted to murder both the Captain and the Greek government agent in a scheme to sell the vessel in Colombia. The crew failed in their mutiny, and the ship was delivered to Nafplion about 25 November 1826. The crew tried a second time to sell the vessel, this time to Ibrahim Pasha, who at the head of an Ottoman-Egyptian force had invaded the Peloponnese. This time, Admiral Andreas Miaoulis and a force of 30 local mariners secured the vessel and dispatched the raucous delivery crew.

After her arrival in Nafplion, three Admirals (Andreas Miaoulis from Hydra, Nikolis Apostolis from Psara and Androutsos from Spetses) took official delivery of the frigate and brought her to the island of Aegina, which had recently become capital of Greece.

The frigate, renamed Hellas, became the flagship of the Greek Navy, as she was the most powerful ship in the navy. Under the command of various captains (among them Cochrane, Antonios Miaoulis, son of the Admiral, and Konstantinos Kanaris), the frigate took part in various successful, but insignificant, naval battles in both the Aegean and Ionian Seas.

== Sinking of the flagship ==
On 27 July 1831, Admiral Miaoulis, who in the meantime had joined the English Party that was opposed to Governor Kapodistrias' Russian Party seized on the island of Poros the navy then under the command of Kanaris. When the government in Nafplion asked Miaoulis to deliver the Greek fleet to the Russian Admiral Pyotr Ivanovich Ricord, Miaoulis refused to obey that order and threatened to scuttle the entire fleet under his command in the event of hostile movement by Ricord. When Ricord attacked Poros Island 13 August, Miaoulis carried out his threats, burning the small fleet. In addition to Hellas, the other scuttled ships were the corvettes Hydra and Spetsai.
