= Vokos =

Vokos is a surname. Notable people with the surname include:

- Nikolaos Vokos (1854–1902), Greek painter
- Gerasimos Vokos (1868–1927), Greek scholar, writer, painter, and journalist
- Andreas Vokos Miaoulis (1769–1835), Greek admiral and politician
