= Mihal (given name) =

Mihal is a given name. Notable people with the given name include:

- Mihal Ashminov (born 1982), Bulgarian celebrity chef
- Mihal Gjika (born 1947), Albanian footballer
- Mihal Grameno (1871–1931), Albanian nationalist, politician, writer, freedom fighter and journalist
- Mihal Kasso, Greek politician
- Mihal Prifti (1918–1986), Albanian politician and diplomat
- Mihal Sherko (1887–1964), Albanian journalist
- Mihal Thano (born 1993), Greek–born Albanian footballer
- Mihal Turtulli (1847–1935), Albanian oculist and politician
- Mihal Zallari (1894–1976), Albanian historian, politician, journalist and poet

== See also ==
- Mihal, surname
