= Mihal =

Mihal is a unisex name that means "who is like a God". Its origin is from Romansh.

Mihal or Mihál is a surname. Notable people with the surname include:

- Dzianis Mihal (born 1985), Belarusian rower
- Joe Mihal (1916–1979), American football player
- Jozef Mihál (born 1965), Slovak politician and tax consultant
- Köse Mihal (13th century – c. 1340), Byzantine emir

== See also ==
- Mihal (given name)
