= USS Hudson (1826) =

American sailing frigate

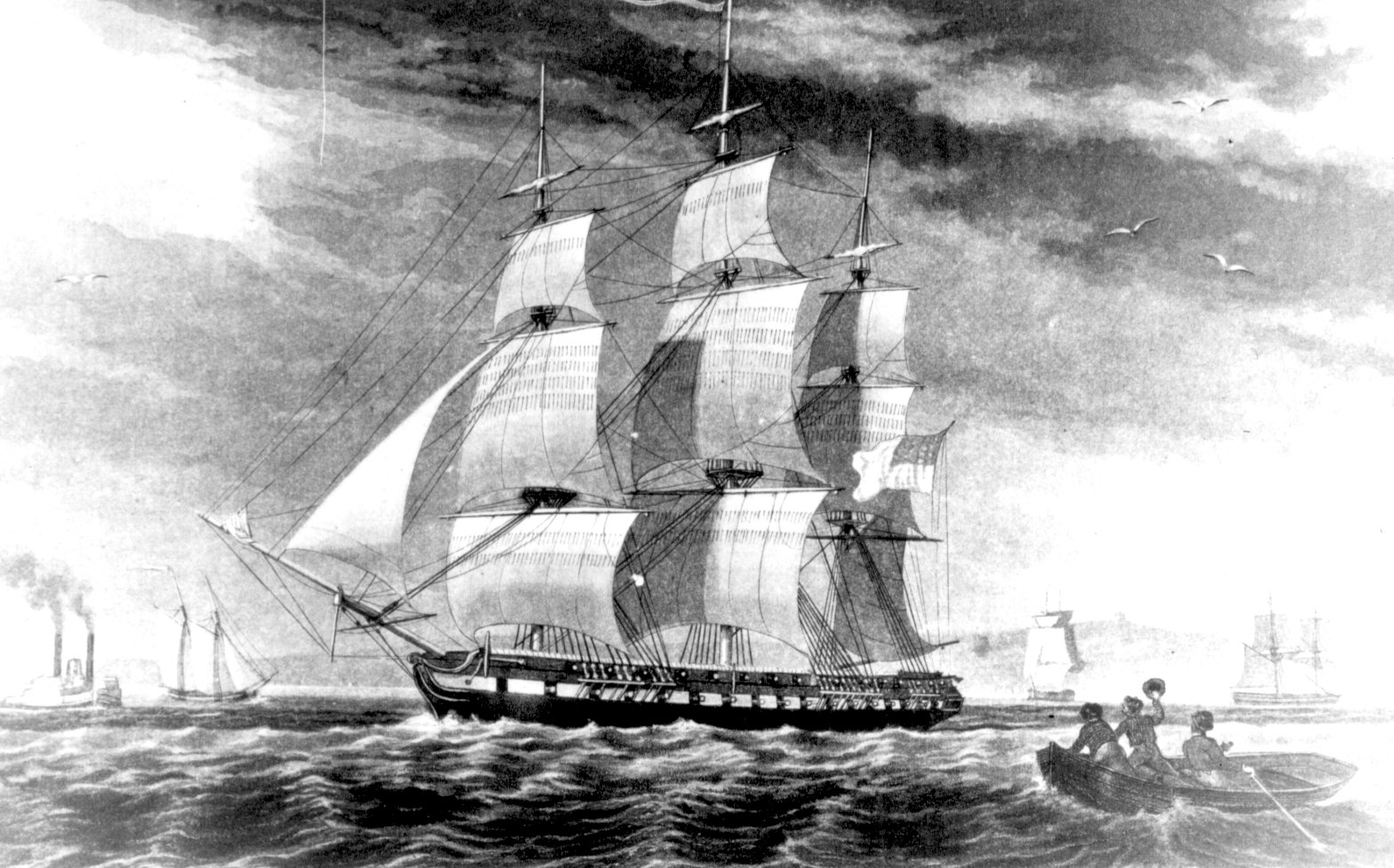
- Engraving of USS Hudson, c. 1826

History

Greek Revolutionaries
- Name: Liberator
- Builder: Smith & Dimon, New York City
- Laid down: 1825
- Launched: November 1825
- Fate: Purchased by the US Navy

United States
- Name: Hudson
- Acquired: 23 August 1826
- Commissioned: 28 September 1828
- Out of service: 4 June 1844
- Fate: Broken up in 1844

General characteristics
- Length: LBP: 177 ft 10 in (54.20 m)
- Beam: 45 ft (14 m)
- Draft: 13 ft 8 in (4.17 m)
- Complement: 450
- Armament: 32 × 32 lb (15 kg) long guns; 30 × 42 lb (19 kg) carronades

USS Hudson was a 62-gun sailing frigate of the United States Navy. She was built as Liberator in New York City for Greek revolutionaries, who ordered two frigates in the United States in an attempt to establish naval superiority during the Greek War for Independence. The rebels were unable to pay for both ships, and Liberator was sold to the US government to cover the cost of her sister ship Hope. The frigate was commissioned into the US Navy in 1828 and named Hudson. Naval officials objected to the purchase, concerned about the ship's quality and their uninvolvement in the purchase. The frigate made one sailing with the Navy to serve as flagship of the Brazil Squadron, where she was involved with the suppression of the Brazilian slave trade. After three years, she returned to the United States. Her hull had begun to rot, and the ship was hulked in 1831 before she was broken up in 1844.

== Development and design ==
During the first years of the Greek War for Independence, Greek revolutionaries used an ad-hoc fleet of privately owned privateers to harass Ottoman trade, cut off enemy reinforcements, and launch hit-and-run raids. This decentralized structure prevented the rebels from directly challenging the Ottoman Navy. By 1824, the vulnerability allowed Egypt—an Ottoman vassal—to land troops in Crete and Morea. Following the defeats, Greek officials attempted to acquire eight frigates in an effort to establish naval superiority and a proper navy. After finding none for sale in Europe, they placed orders for six paddle steam frigates in the United Kingdom and two 64-gun frigates in the United States.

Concurrently, shipyards in New York built vessels for revolutionary forces throughout the Americas. The Smith and Dimon Shipyard agreed to build one of the Greek frigates, which was named Liberator. She was 177 feet 10 inches (54.20 m) long between perpendiculars, had a beam of 45 feet (14 m), draft of 13 feet 8 inches (4.17 m), and displaced 1,728 tonnes (1,905 short tons). She featured an unbroken sheer, three masts, and two complete gundecks with a broadside of 66 guns, which gave her the appearance of a ship of the line. The shipyard specialized in packet ships and used the experience to design the large frigate with a hull form reminiscent of the civilian ships.

== Service history ==
Liberator was laid down in 1825 and launched in November 1825. Alongside Hope, the two American-built ships were funded by British loans and donations to the Greek cause. Embezzlement and mismanagement rapidly reduced available money, and funds to pay for both ships ran out before they were delivered. Arbitrators reviewed the issue and decided to sell Liberator to cover the cost of both. The shipyard lobbied Congress to accept the ship, who in turn pressured the Navy. The frigate was bought by the US government on 23 August 1826 and completed in September 1828. Under American control, the ship was renamed Hudson; while the namesake is uncertain, the Dictionary of American Naval Fighting Ships speculates she was named after the river of the same name. The unique procurement made Hudson the last privately built sailing frigate in the Navy. Under American control, she had a complement of 450 and featured an armament of thirty-two 32 lb (15 kg) long guns and thirty 42 lb (19 kg) carronades.

Officials in the Navy detested the frigate and viewed her as a burden, and the purchase was seen as an attempt to dispose of the ship by making her the Navy's problem. The construction quality and build material was widely criticized, although reports may have been overzealous in describing issues. After a visit from President John Quincy Adams, she was commissioned on 28 September 1828. The same day, she left New York to serve as Commodore John Orde Creighton's flagship of the Brazil Squadron. The ship arrived at Rio de Janeiro on 29 November, and with the rest of the squadron, patrolled the Brazilian coast and inspected merchant ships to suppress the Brazilian slave trade. Hudson also visited various South American ports and served as a patrol vessel at Montevideo and Rio de Janeiro.

Early into the voyage, Captain Stephen Cassin described rapid decay onboard and believed the ship could safely operate for less than a year. Structural issues, constant need for maintenance, and Creighton's strictness led the crew of Hudson to face the second-most court-martials in the Navy between 1829 and 1837, with almost twenty held during or immediately after the voyage. USS Java experienced the most court-martials during the same timeframe, which likewise suffered from chronic structural and maintenance issues. Hudson left the station on 13 June 1831 and arrived at New York City on 5 August. The hull, made of white oak rather than preferred live oak, had already decayed by the time she returned. As a result, the frigate was reused as a receiving ship in the port before she was sold off on 4 June 1844 and broken up the same year.
