= Francesco Pige =

Italian painter of 19th century

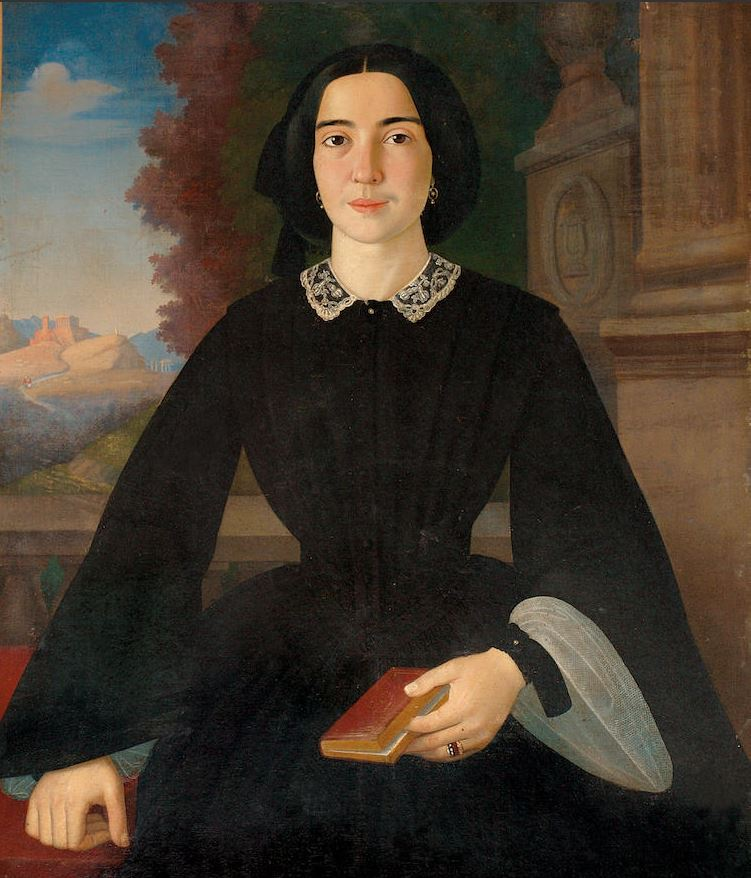
Portrait of Penelope Deligiorghis-Drossini

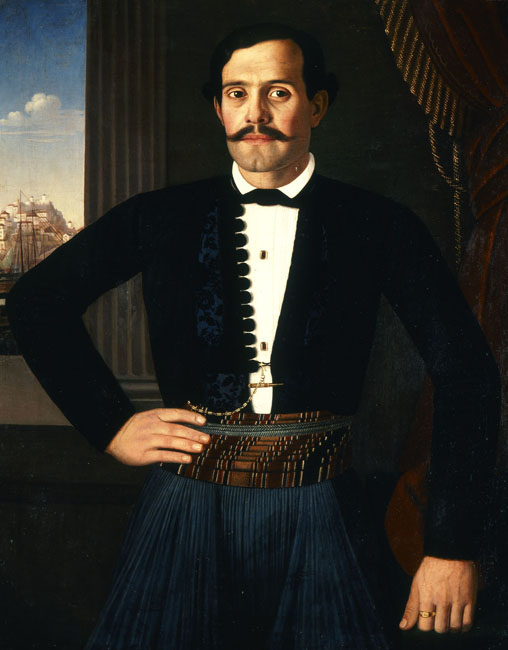
Portrait of Andreas Kriezis

Francesco Pige (Greek: Φραντέσκο Πίτζε; 1822 Grins, Tyrol – 1862) was an Italian painter of the 19th century.

== Biography ==
Born in 1822 at Grins, Tyrol, and studied painting from 1842 to 1845 in Munich, Bavaria. He later continued his studies for three years in Rome and then settled in Greece. He dealt mainly with portraiture and to a lesser extent with landscape painting while most of his work consists of portraits of members of important island families who were active during the years of Greek Revolution, a fact which according to several biographies of the artist leads to the conclusion that he worked mainly in the country's islands. He is thought to have died in 1862, but the exact date of his death is disputed.

== Works ==
Although Pige had his own characteristic way of rendering the figures, several of his works were formerly attributed to Andreas Kriezis. The poses in his works were formal and rigid, with a background of archeological sites, monuments, islands and cities. The style in which Pige portrayed his figures connects his works with the German and Flemish painting of the 16th and 17th centuries, while references to Greek antiquity and the romantic-classicist mood reveal the influence of the classical ideals of his time. The identity of his works became known when, in the portrait of the Hydriot, Stamatis Voudouris, the inscription "Hydra, 7/19 Aprile 1857, Francesco Pige di Tirolo pinxit" was found. This fact led to the identification of other works with similar stylistic features.
