= Athanasios N. Miaoulis =

Greek naval officer and politician

Athanasios N. Miaoulis Αθανάσιος Ν. Μιαούλης
- Born: 1868; Piraeus, Greece
- Died: 1932 (aged 63–64)

Athanasios N. Miaoulis (Greek: Αθανάσιος Ν. Μιαούλης, 1868–1932) was a Greek naval officer and politician, serving several times as Navy Minister and briefly as the Mayor of Piraeus. He was the great-grandson of admiral Andreas Miaoulis, the chief Greek naval leader during the Greek War of Independence.

== Biography ==
Miaoulis was born in Piraeus in 1868, to the Hydriot family of Miaoulis. Together with his cousin Andreas D. Miaoulis, he enrolled in the Hellenic Naval Academy in 1884, the year of its re-establishment. He graduated in 1888 as an ensign, and took part in the Greco-Turkish War of 1897 as captain of a torpedo boat, with the rank of sub-lieutenant. He retired as a commander in 1911 in order to run for public office in Hydra. With the outbreak of the Balkan Wars, he was recalled to service, and was assigned as captain of the destroyer Panthir, from its delivery in Britain to the signing of the peace treaties, whereupon he returned to reserve status.

In 1909, he served as Minister of Naval Affairs, a post he held again in 1914, 1915 and 1919. As a diehard Venizelist, he was persuaded in 1932 to run for the mayoralty of Piraeus, despite his own reluctance. He accepted on the condition that he could resign following a possible victory of the Liberal Party in the forthcoming legislative elections. Indeed, the Venizelists won the elections, opening the prospect of his retirement from the mayor's office and politics in general. This filled Miaoulis with such joy, that he suffered a heart attack, to which he succumbed. Four years later, on 16 June 1936, his wife, Maria Lykoudis, also died as a result of an illness caused by her grief.
