= Andreas Kriezis =

Greek painter

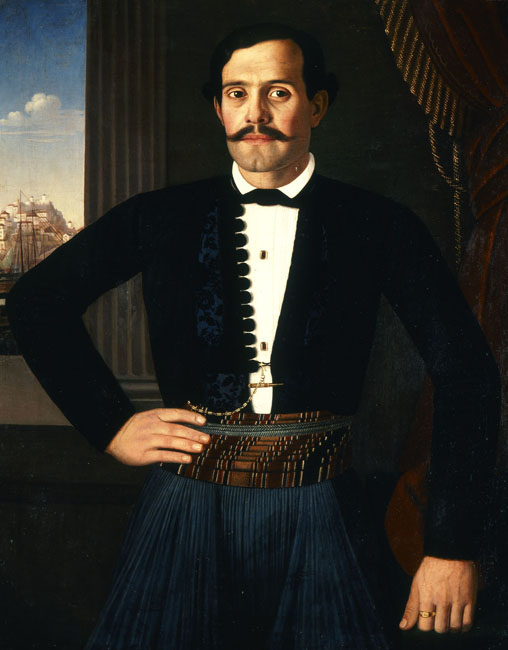
- Andreas Kriezis (1850s) by Francesco Pige
- Born: 1813 or 1816; Hydra, Ottoman Empire (now Greece)
- Died: c. 1880; Hydra, Kingdom of Greece

Andreas Kriezis (Greek: Ανδρέας Κριεζής; 1813/1816 – c. 1880) was a Greek painter, primarily of portraits and maritime subjects.

== Biography ==
Andreas Kriezis was born on Hydra and was the son of an Arvanite Captain of merchant vessel. Some sources claim that he was actually the brother of Prime Minister Antonios Kriezis, but this seems very unlikely and the relationship, if any, remains unclear.

Rather than follow his family's traditional maritime occupations, he went to Athens, where he worked as a lithographer at the Royal Printing House. In 1839, he went to Paris, to improve his skills in his chosen field, but turned to painting instead.

On his return to Greece in 1851, he taught drawing at the gymnasium in Syros. While there, he discovered and became an advocate for the young painter, Konstantinos Volanakis. Later, he became an itinerant artist, travelling throughout the Saronic Gulf while competing in several exhibitions from 1859 to 1875.

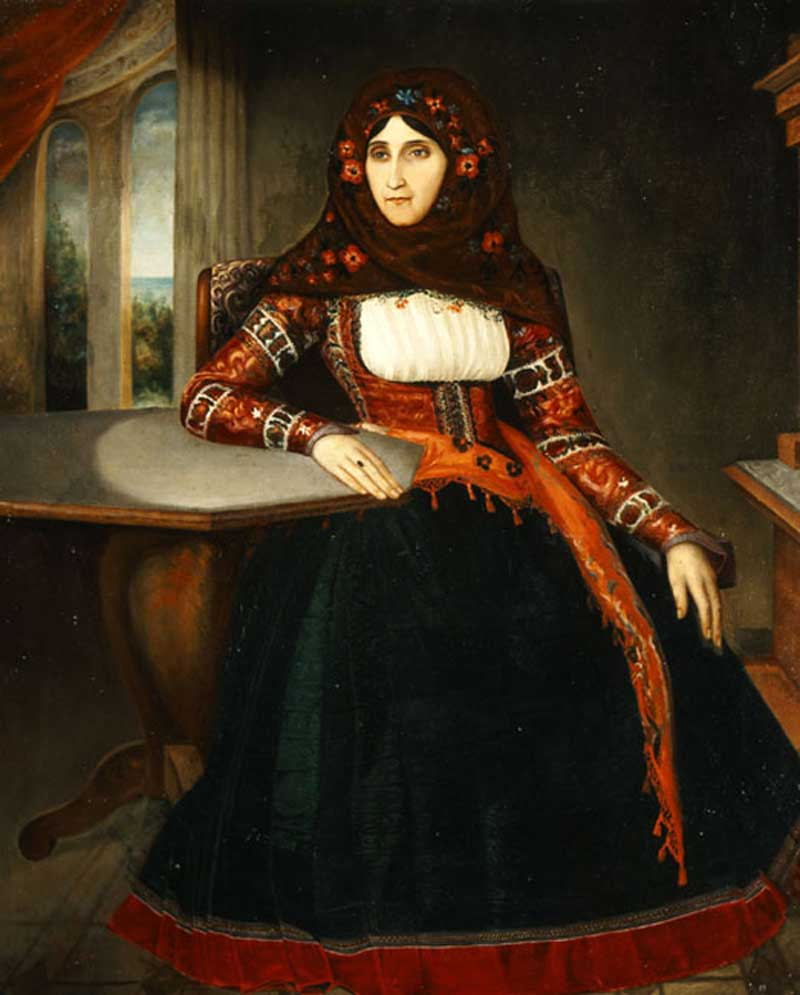
Portrait of a Lady from Hydra

Although mostly a portrait painter, he is known to have painted murals at the "Church of Saint Irene" on Poros. As a rule, he did not sign his works, so only a small number of canvases are attributed to him with certainty. His brushwork is very similar to that of Francesco Pige, an Italian-born painter who was his friend. In fact, many of Pige's early works were originally attributed to Kriezis. The authorship of many is still uncertain.

His death is generally believed to have come in 1880, but certainly after 1877.

Many of his works are in private collections, but may also be seen at the National Gallery of Greece, the Benaki Museum, and the Historical Museum of Hydra.
