= Kara Mehmet (Kapudan Pasha) =

Ottoman officer

Kara Mehmet Pasha was an Alawite Ottoman officer from Antioch. He became briefly Kapudan Pasha in 1822 during the Greek War of Independence.

Formerly Master-General of the Artillery, he was given in January 1822 the command of the land troops sent to reinforce the Ottoman garrisons in revolted Greece; he landed in Patras at the end of February.

After the death of the then Kapudan Pasha on June 18 at the hands of Konstantinos Kanaris, Kara Mehmet, still in Patras, was appointed to the post. The Ottoman fleet was sent from Istanbul through the Aegean to fetch him and he took command at the beginning of August.

The Ottoman fleet weighted anchor from Patras September 8 in order to resupply the besieged town of Nauplia, but the operation (Sept 20 to 25) was a failure and Kara Mehmet withdrawn to Souda Bay.

After inconclusive actions in the Cyclades, the Ottoman fleet sheered to Tenedos. There it was attacked by the Greeks on November 10, and lost a two-decker ship burnt by Kanaris. The disarrayed Turkish fleet took refuge in the Dardanelles and rejoined its base in Istanbul.

At the end of the year, Kara Mehmet was dismissed from his post and replaced by Koca Hüsrev Mehmed Pasha.
