= Dimitrios Kriezis =

Greek naval officer

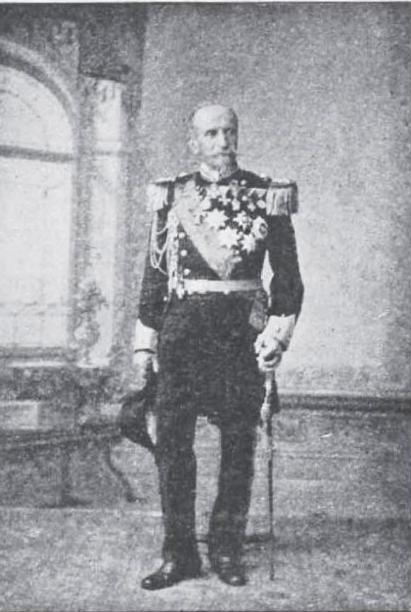
- Dimirios Kriezis c. 1896
- Native name: Δημήτριος Κριεζής
- Allegiance: Kingdom of Greece
- Branch: Hellenic Navy
- Rank: Rear Admiral
- Conflicts: Greco-Turkish War of 1897
- Other work: aide-de-camp of George I

Dimitrios Kriezis (Greek: Δημήτριος Κριεζής) was a Greek naval officer. He was the second son of Admiral and Greek War of Independence hero Antonios Kriezis. He served as the aide-de-camp of King George I of Greece, became Minister for Naval Affairs in the Nikolaos Deligiannis cabinet of 1895, and headed the Greek fleet's Ionian Sea squadron during the Greco-Turkish War of 1897.

He retired with the rank of Rear Admiral.

== Sources ==
- Gerasimos Vokos (1896). K. Meissner & N. Kargadouris (ed.). Greece during the Olympic Games of 1896. Athens: Estia.
