= Greek ship Kriezis =

At least two ships of the Hellenic Navy have borne the name Kriezis (Greek: Κριεζής) after Greek naval hero Antonios Kriezis:

- Greek corvette Kriezis, a Flower-class corvette launched in 1941 as HMS Coreopsis and transferred to Greece and renamed in 1943. She was scrapped in 1952.
- Greek destroyer Kriezis (D217), a Gearing-class destroyer launched in 1945 as USS Corry she was transferred to Greece in 1981 and renamed. She was scrapped in 2002.
