= Hamdi Bey =

Miralay Hamdi Bey, Hamdi Baba, also known as "Kambur (humpback) Hamdi" (1861–1927) and Hamdi Bey was an Ottoman officer and politician of ethnic Albanian origin. Hamdi Bey was a colonel of the Ottoman army and later a deputy of the Ottoman parliament.

== Life ==
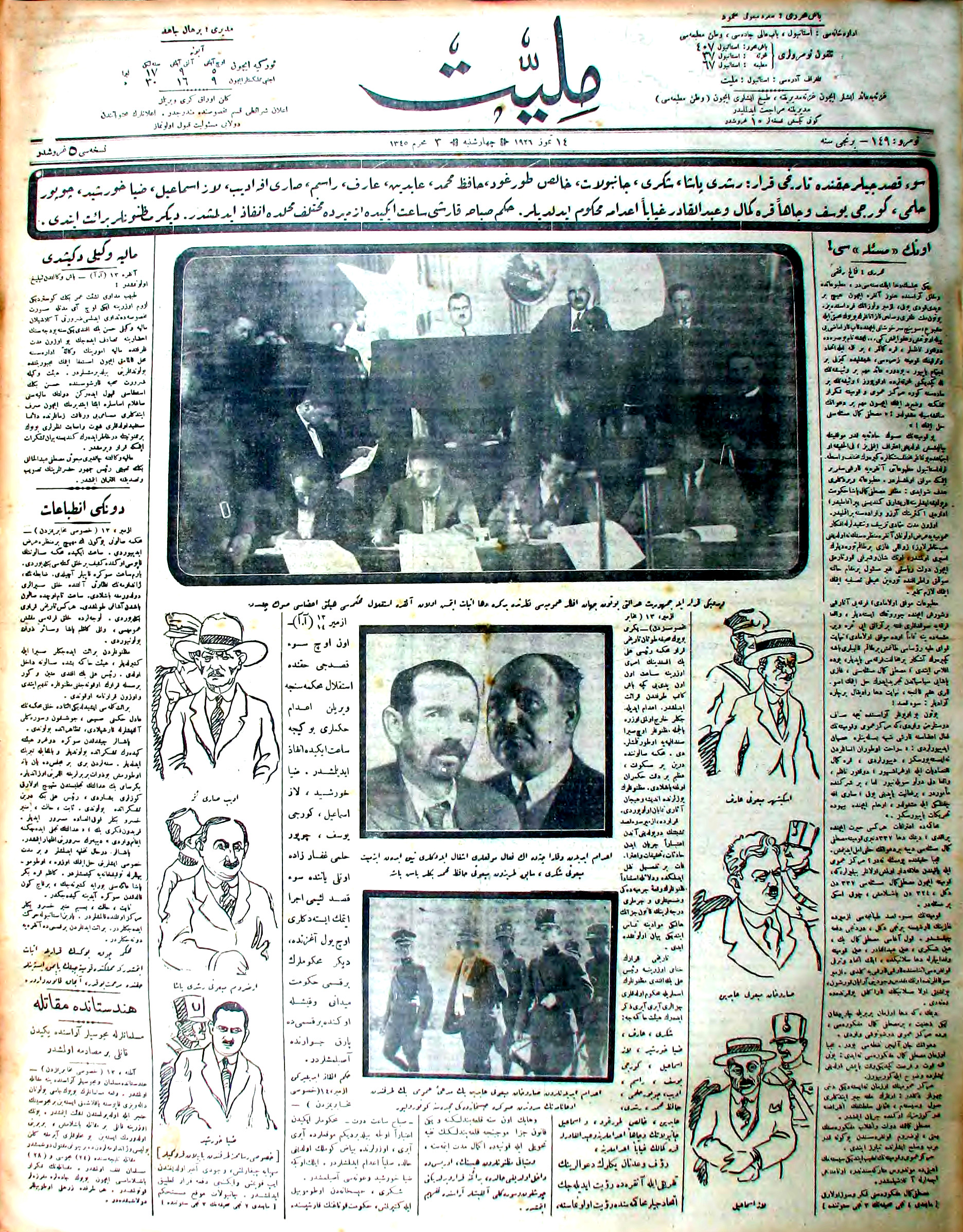
The 14 July 1926 issue of the Turkish Newspaper Milliyet on the day the verdict was delivered in the Izmir Conspiracy Case (Assassination Attempt on the Life of Mustafa Kemal)

Hamdi Bey was born to Haji Mahmud Efendi in 1861 in Margariti, modern northwestern Greece (Chameria). After studying at the local madrasah he joined the ranks of the Ottoman military forces. In the Greco-Turkish War of 1897 he commanded troops in the Preveza area, for which he became Kaymakam (Lieutenant Colonel) of the Ottoman Army. In 1903 he rose to the rank of Miralay (Colonel), as the commander of the gendarmerie of the vilayet of Scutari, while later he commanded the gendarmerie regiment of Trabzon.

April 26, 1909, he was elected deputy of the sanjak of Preveza. As a deputy along with nine other notable Albanian deputies of the Ottoman parliament he supported the use of the Latin script in the standardization of the Albanian alphabet.

He became the honorary president of M.M. (Mim-Mim) Group July 21, 1921, during the Turkish War of Independence. He was interned for allegedly taking part in the Izmir Conspiracy against Mustafa Kemal, but was released August 26, 1926, because no evidence connecting him to the incident was found.
