= Nikolaos Vokos =

Greek painter

Nikolaos Vokos Νικόλαος Βώκος
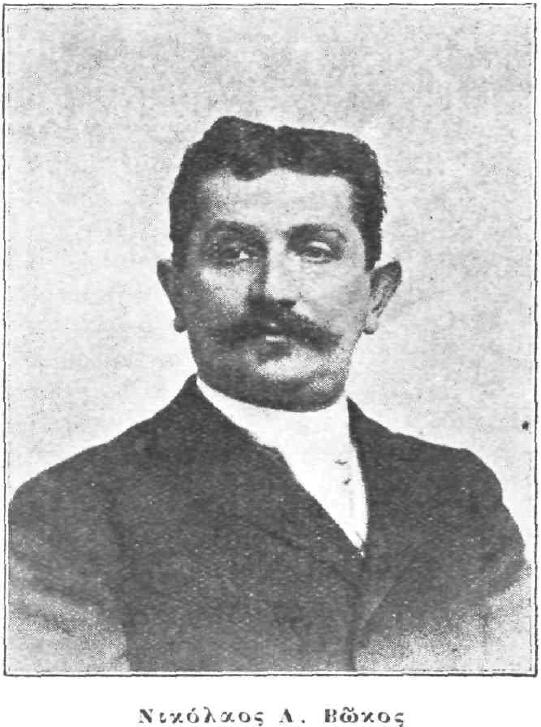
- Born: c. 1854; Hydra, Greece
- Died: August 7, 1902 (aged 47–48); Athens, Greece
- Occupation: painter

Nikolaos Vokos (Greek: Νικόλαος Βώκος; c. 1854 – August 7, 1902) was a Greek painter of the Munich School art movement.

== Biography ==
Descended from the Arvanite Vokos family of Hydra, he was the son of Emmanouil Miaoulis and a grandson of Admiral Andreas Vokos Miaoulis. He was initially enrolled in the Cadet School, but on discovering his passion for painting he left it to study at the Athens School of Fine Arts from 1874 until 1878. In 1885, after a competition, he won a scholarship to continue his studies in Munich under Nicholaos Gysis, Ludwig Löfftz, and Andreas Müller. He remained in Munich for 16 years, running a painting school, until where he became ill and returned to Athens in 1902. He died on August 7, 1902, at Palaio Faliro, Athens.

== Work ==
Vokos used several motifs, especially realistic still life. He participated in relatively few exhibitions: Munich 1898, Paris 1900, Athens at the Parnassos Club at 1901, etc. Among his more notable prize-winning paintings are the Fisherman (Ιχθυοπώλης), which won the Chicago Award, Epitrapezion (Επιτραπέζιον) which was bought and exhibited at the palace of the Bavarian prince regent Luitpold.
