= Emmanouil A. Miaoulis =

Greek naval officer

Emmanouil A. Miaoulis Εμμανουήλ Α. Μιαούλης
- Born: Hydra
- Occupations: Hydrographer, naval officer

Emmanouil A. Miaoulis (Greek: Εμμανουήλ Α. Μιαούλης) was a Greek naval officer active during the first decades of the existence of the Royal Hellenic Navy.

== Biography ==
He was born into the notable Hydriot family of Miaoulis, which had played a prominent role in the Greek War of Independence. His father was Antonios Miaoulis, an officer in the War of Independence, and second son of the great admiral Andreas Vokos Miaoulis.

After independence, Emmanouil Miaoulis joined the newly established Royal Navy. In 1853, he was appointed to teach theoretical navigation at the recently founded Hellenic Naval Academy, whose classes were held aboard the corvette Loudovikos. He then was assigned as captain of the steam schooner Panope, and was sent to Britain to sail it home. During the voyage, the ship ran aground off Ferrol on northern Spain on 14 December 1856. Miaoulis was able to extricate his crew by correctly calculating the tide, but the ship had to be given up for lost. Exonerated by the subsequent court martial, in 1857 he was sent back to England to receive another newly built steam schooner, the Afroessa.
