= Dimitrios Miaoulis =

Dimitrios Miaoulis Δημήτριος Μιαούλης
- Born: 1794; Hydra (now Greece)
- Died: 1836 (aged 41–42); Greece
- Occupations: hydrographer, naval leader

Dimitrios Miaoulis (Greek: Δημήτριος Μιαούλης, 1794–1836) was a Greek revolutionary leader.

== Biography ==
He was born in Hydra in 1794 and was the first son of the naval leader Andreas Miaoulis who participated in the Greek War of Independence from the Historic Hydrian family of Miaoulis.

He was educated into the navigation during his childhood years and with the outbreak of the revolution, he was the first to represent from all of his family. In April 1821, he was appointed by the community of Hydra as a fleet commander of the Hydrian boats which with the cooperation of Spetses ships sailed into the Gulf of Corinth in May.

In September 1825 he headed for England for asking the protection of Greece from England in the model of the United States of the Ionian Islands.

After the national he was ranked with a mark of a ship leader from the Royal Navy, after Kapodistrias, he was granted federal land.

He died in 1836. He was married to Maroussa Voudouri and he had three children, Andreas, Nikolaos, and Dimitrios.
