= Emmanouil Miaoulis =

Greek naval officer

Emmanouil Miaoulis Εμμανουήλ Μιαούλης
- Born: 1812; Hydra, Ottoman Empire
- Died: 1871 (aged 58–59)
- Occupation: naval officer

Emmanouil Miaoulis (Greek: Εμμανουήλ Μιαούλης, 1812 - 1871) was a Greek naval officer. He was born in the island of Hydra in 1812, the son of Andreas Vokos Miaoulis, who became the leader of the Greek Navy in the Greek War of Independence. As a member of the renowned Hydriot Miaoulis family, a naval career came naturally to him. He was enrolled into the Royal Hellenic Navy and achieved the rank of Captain, and the post of commander of the Poros Naval Base. He died in 1871. The painter Nikolaos Vokos was his son.
