= Gerasimos Vokos =

Greek writer (1868–1927)

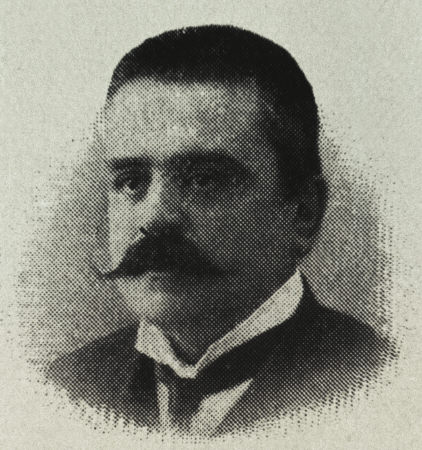
- Born: 1868; Patras, Greece
- Died: 1927; Paris, France
- Occupation: Writer

Gerasimos Vokos (Greek: Γεράσιμος Βώκος; 1868–1927) was a Greek scholar, writer, painter, and journalist.

Descended from the Arvanite family Vokos family of Hydra, he was born in Patras in 1868 and died in Paris, France in 1928.

He began his career as a journalist, displaying particular talent as a chronicler and an article writer, at the most important Athenian newspapers of that time. He continued as an author, publishing several studies and monographs, as well as several books on various subjects. Among his most notable works are the 1893 novel Mr. President (Greek: Ο Κύριος Πρόεδρος, romanized: O Kyrios Proedros), the theatrical plays The Year '21 (Greek: Το 21, referring to the Greek War of Independence) and The Megali Idea (Greek: Η Μεγάλη Ιδέα), both from 1901, the historical novel The Occupation (Greek: Η κατοχή, romanized: I katochi), which was later adapted as a play, Greek Symphonies (Greek: Ελληνικαί Συμφωνίαι, romanized: Ellinikai Symfoniai) in 1916, his 1923 Short Stories (Greek: Διηγήματα, romanized: Diigimata), the 1923 novel The Exile (Greek: Εκτοπισμένος, romanized: Ektopismenos), and others.

He also founded and managed two literary journals, Our Journal (Greek: Το περιοδικό μας, romanized: To periodiko mas), published every fortnight in Piraeus in 1900, and Artist (Greek: Καλλιτέχνης, romanized: Kallitechnis), published in Athens in 1910–12 and 1914. During the last years of his life he settled in Paris, where he experienced some success as a painter, despite being self-taught. The subjects of his work were drawn from Greek landscapes (particularly Mount Pelion) and Parisian life.
