= Dimitrios D. Miaoulis =

Greek naval officer

Dimitrios D. Miaoulis Δημήτριος Δ. Μιαούλης
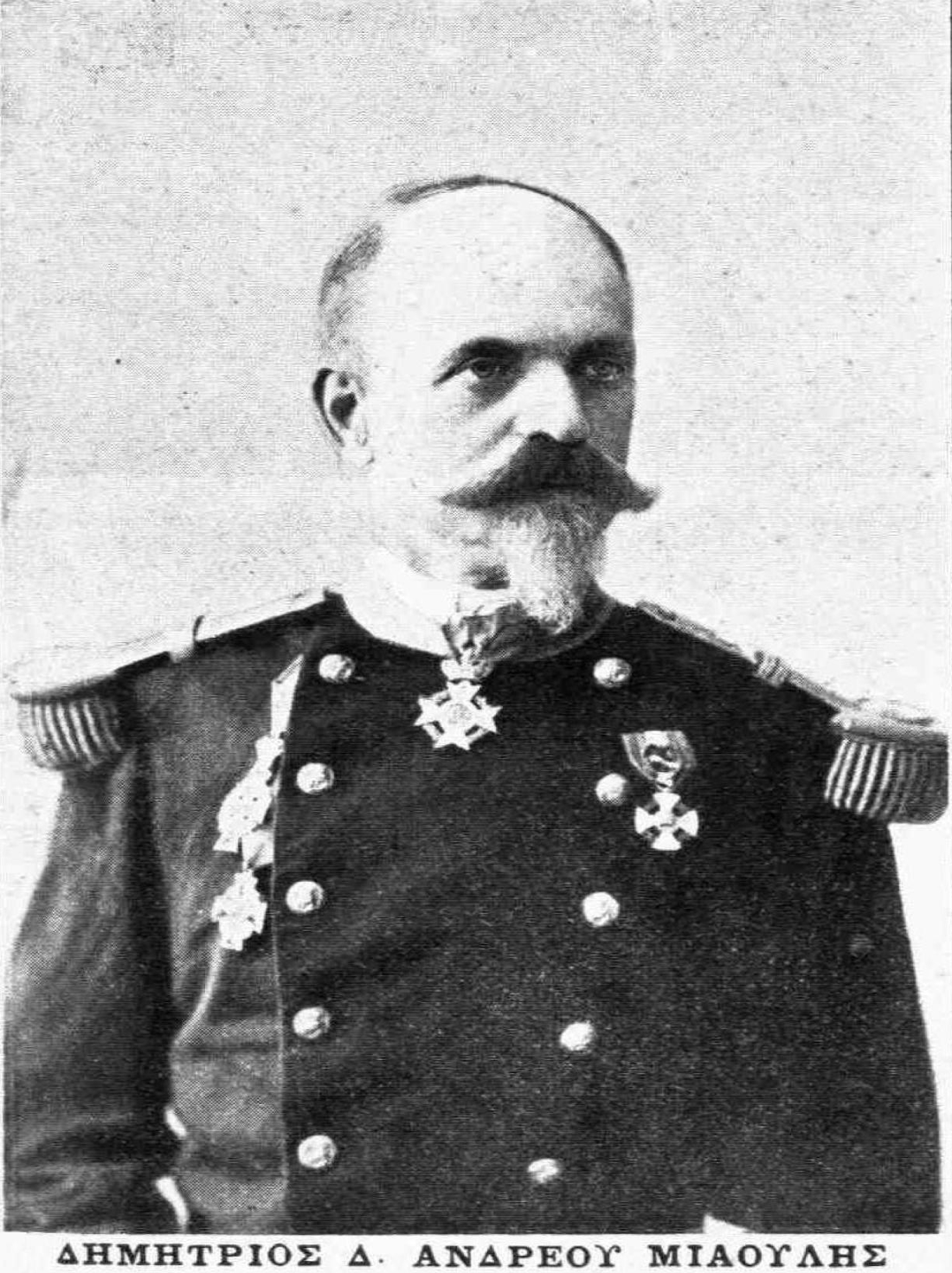
- Born: 1836; Hydra, Greece
- Died: 1899 (aged 62–63)
- Occupations: hydrographer, naval commander

Dimitrios D. Miaoulis (Greek: Δημήτριος Δ. Μιαούλης, 1836–1899) was a Greek naval officer. He was the son of Dimitrios Miaoulis and grandson of Andreas Miaoulis, the Greek navy's chief commander during the Greek War of Independence.

He was born in Hydra in 1836 shortly after his father's death. He was highly educated, and enjoyed the favour of King George I of Greece, who appointed him as captain of the royal yacht Amfitriti. Promoted to captain in 1890, he was appointed Commander of the Hellenic Navy Academy in 1892, which he led until his death in 1899.
