= Antonios Kriezis =

Greek politician (1796–1865)

- Αντώνιος Κριεζής
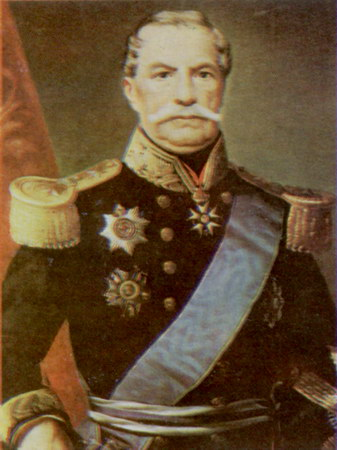
- A portrait of Antonios Kriezis

Prime Minister of Greece
- In office 14 December 1849 – 16 May 1854
- Monarch: Otto
- Preceded by: Konstantinos Kanaris
- Succeeded by: Alexandros Mavrokordatos

Minister for Naval Affairs
- In office 14 February 1836 – 3 September 1842
- Monarch: Otto
- Prime Minister: Josef Ludwig von Armansperg; Ignaz von Rudhart; Alexandros Mavrokordatos
- Preceded by: Wilhelm von Le Suire
- Succeeded by: Konstantinos Kanaris

Personal details
- Born: c. 1796 Troezen, Morea Eyalet, Ottoman Empire (now Greece)
- Died: 1 April 1865 Athens, Kingdom of Greece
- Spouse: Kyriakoula Voulgari
- Children: Dimitrios Kriezis; Epameinondas Kriezis
- Occupation: Sailor; Politician

Military service
- Allegiance: First Hellenic Republic; Kingdom of Greece
- Branch/service: Hellenic Navy
- Battles/wars: Greek War of Independence; Battle of Nauplia; Greek raid on Alexandria

Antonios Kriezis (Greek: Αντώνιος Κριεζής; c. 1796–1865) was a captain of the Hellenic navy during the Greek War of Independence and a Prime Minister of Greece from 1849 to 1854.

== Family ==
Kriezis was born in Troezen in about 1796 to an Arvanite family. Their first known ancestor was a prisoner in Venetian Crete who became involved in shipbuilding in Venetian navies and settled in Hydra in 1650.

== Career ==
In July 1821, Kriezis took part in the Greek expedition to Samos, and in 1822 participated in the naval battle of Spetses. In 1825, he and Konstantinos Kanaris failed in their attempt to destroy the Egyptian navy inside the port of Alexandria. In 1828, Ioannis Kapodistrias placed him in command of a naval squadron. The following year, he captured Vonitsa from the Ottomans.

In 1836, under King Otto, he became Minister of Naval Affairs. He served as Prime Minister of Greece from 24 December 1849, until 28 May 1854.

== Death ==
He died in Athens in 1865.

== Children ==
His older son, Dimitrios Kriezis, became a naval officer and served as the aide-de-camp to King George I of Greece and as Minister for Naval Affairs, while his younger son, Epameinondas Kriezis, also became a naval officer and politician.

== Honours ==
Two ships of the Hellenic Navy have been named Kriezis in his honour.

Political offices
Preceded by Konstantinos Kanaris	Prime Minister of Greece; 14 December 1849- 16 May 1854	Succeeded by Konstantinos Kanaris
