= Ioannis A. Miaoulis =

Greek naval officer

Ioannis A. Miaoulis Ιωάννης Α. Μιαούλης
- Born: 1850; Piraeus
- Died: 1913 ) Salamina, Greece
- Occupation: navy leader

Ioannis A. Miaoulis (Greek: Ιωάννης Α. Μιαούλης, 1850–1913) was a Greek naval officer. He was a relative of Antonios Miaoulis (a revolutionary leader), and was a member of the Miaoulis family from Hydra.

== Biography ==
He was born in Piraeus in 1850, and enrolled into the Navy Academy, teaming up as a second level in 1874. He was ranked up to a mark of a rear-admiral, and during the Greco-Turkish War of 1897, he was ranked with a mark of lieutenant commander as a leader of the steamship Pineios. He also admirably from one of the navy leaders of the Great Powers, with the help from chiefs of Prince George of Greece of the torpedo's fate, made it over target boat Eta and captured the steamship Georgios of the Turkish shipping company "Hagi Daut Farkuh" which it got Turkish soldiers in the battle of Crete. Later on, he captured the sailboat ship which he entered the English pro-Turkish politician and journalist A. Bartlett, an autographer of the sultan' letter to the Turkish military leader of Crete Ethem Pasha.

He died as a rear-admiral at the Salamina Navy Yard in 1913.

== Notes ==
- The ship Georgios was a Turkish commanding ship which he became a war loot and seized, it later enlisted into the Greek Navy power with the name Kriti (Crete) and Avra.
- The English journalist which memorized which he platformed later with a lot of humour with Ioannis Miaoulis as a peculiar in character without that he exempted from his perception in which he executed his duty.
