= Nikolaos Miaoulis =

Greek naval officer

Nikolaos Miaoulis Νικόλαος Μιαούλης
- Born: c. 1818; Hydra
- Died: 1872; Athens, Greece
- Occupation: Naval officer

Nikolaos Miaoulis (Greek: Νικόλαος Μιαούλης, c. 1818 – 1872) was a Greek naval officer. He was the son of Andreas Miaoulis, a revolutionary leader, and was a member of the Miaoulis family from Hydra.

== Biography ==
Miaoulis was born in Hydra in about 1818. He studied at a military school in Munich together with Athanasios Miaoulis when he was small. He entered on an English ship and enrolled himself into the Royal Navy with his brother. When his brother entered politics, Miaoulis entered as an aide-de-camp to King Otto until his abdication. He died in Athens in 1872.
