= Greek cruiser Navarchos Miaoulis =

- Navarchos Miaoulis - Ναύαρχος Μιαούλης

History

Greece
- Name: Navarchos Miaoulis
- Namesake: Andreas Vokos Miaoulis
- Ordered: 1877
- Builder: Forges et Chantiers de la Méditerranée
- Laid down: 1878
- Launched: 26 April 1879
- Commissioned: 1879
- Decommissioned: 1931
- Fate: Stricken

General characteristics
- Type: Cruiser
- Displacement: Standard 1,820 tons
- Length: 75 m (246 ft)
- Beam: 11 m (36 ft)
- Draught: 4.4 m (14 ft)
- Propulsion: sail; one propeller 2,400 hp (1,800 kW)
- Speed: 13.5-knot (25 km/h) maximum
- Complement: 180
- Armament: 3 × 6.7-inch (170 mm)/25 calibre guns in single mounts; 1 × 6.7-inch (170 mm)/20 calibre gun; 6 × 37 mm (1 in) 1-pounder guns in single mounts

Navarchos Miaoulis (Greek: Ναύαρχος Μιαούλης, "Navarchos Miaoulis") was a 1,820 ton Greek three-masted cruiser (in Greek termed Εύδρομο) named for the admiral Andreas Miaoulis, the leader of the Greek rebels' fleet during the Greek War of Independence (1821-1829). The "Navarchos Miaoulis," as it was formally named, had been constructed in 1878 at the famed Forges et Chantiers shipyard in the French town of La Seyne, following designs by Lagan, and funded by the National Fleet Fund. It arrived at the port of Piraeus in October of 1879, originally classified as a "Battleship."

== Characteristics ==
Navarchos Miaoulis was an unprotected cruiser. She was 246 feet long with a beam of 36 feet and a mean draught of 14'5". The hull was made of iron and wood. Displacement was 1,800 ton. The engines produced 2,200 ihp and used 1 propeller for a speed of 15 knots.

In the early 1890s, armament was three Krupp 17 cm RK L/25 in a single mounts, and one 17 cm RK L/20. There were also two machine guns and four very light guns.

== Service ==
Navarchos Miaoulis was launched on 26 April 1879 by Forges et Chantiers de la Méditerranée at their La Seyne yard in France. She was purchased by Greece as part of their program of naval expansion after the unsuccessful Cretan uprising of 1866. She was soon rendered operationally obsolete with the acquisition of newer, faster and larger ships such as the battleship Spetsai and was made into a training ship. She served on active duty in this capacity until decommissioned in 1931.
