= Mihal Thano =

Footballer (born 1993)

Personal information
- Full name: Mihal Thano
- Date of birth: 29 April 1993 (age 33)
- Place of birth: Ioannina, Greece
- Position: Goalkeeper

Youth career
- –2012: PAS Giannina

Senior career*
| Years | Team | Apps | (Gls) |
| 2012–2016 | Luftëtari | 39 | (0) |
- * Club domestic league appearances and goals

Mihal Thano (born 29 April 1993) is a professional footballer who most recently played for Luftëtari Gjirokastër in the Albanian Superliga.

== Honours ==
Luftëtari

- Albanian First Division (1): 2015–16
