= Andreas A. Miaoulis =

Greek naval officer

Andreas A. Miaoulis Ανδρέας Α. Μιαούλης
- Born: 1830; Hydra, First Hellenic Republic
- Died: Unknown; Greece
- Occupations: hydrographer Naval officer
- Parent: Antonios Miaoulis
- Relatives: Andreas Miaoulis (grandfather)

Andreas A. Miaoulis (Greek: Ανδρέας Α. Μιαούλης; born 1830) was a Greek naval officer, hailing from the historic Hydriot Miaoulis family. He was the son of Antonios Miaoulis and grandson of Andreas Miaoulis, the Greek navy's chief admiral during the Greek War of Independence.

== Biography ==
He was born on the island of Hydra in 1830. He attended the Navy School and was commissioned as a sublieutenant in 1854. He was one of the first Greek officers to study hydrography, a largely ignored subject (considered as "irrelevant" by most), for which he was derisively nicknamed "the teacher". His obsession with the subject, taking regular depth and sea temperature measurements, resulted in his dismissal "for abandoning his position" in the same year. He was placed on the reserve list, from which he was also expelled barely two years later. A decade later, in 1866, when the importance of hydrography had become apparent, he was recalled to active duty. As captain of the ship Methoni, he further enhanced his knowledge on the subject by observing the measurements made by the British hydrographer Arthur Mansell in the Euripus Strait.

Miaoulis was the first Greek hydrographer, and discovered the namesake reef in the Ionian Sea. He published papers concerning the tidal currents in the Euripus Strait, as well as those predicted for the new canal at the Isthmus of Corinth.
