= Antonios Miaoulis =

Greek politician (1800–1836)

Antonios Miaoulis Αντώνιος Μιαούλης
- Born: c. 1800; Hydra (now in Greece)
- Died: 25 October 1836 (aged 35–36); Bavaria
- Occupation: naval officer

Antonios Miaoulis (Greek: Αντώνιος Μιαούλης; c. 1800 – 25 October 1836) was a Greek politician and a revolutionary leader during the Greek War of Independence.

== Biography ==
He was born on the island of Hydra and was the second son of the Hydriot admiral Andreas Miaoulis, a member of the historic Miaoulis family.

He participated in many naval battles during the war, and when Otto of Bavaria became king, Antonios Miaoulis was appointed as his aide-de-camp. In this capacity he escorted Otto to Bavaria in 1836, where he was to be married to Amalia of Oldenburg. He died there on 25 October of cholera and is buried in Uffenheim.

His sons were Andreas and Emmanouil.
