= Andreas Miaoulis (born 1819) =

Andreas Miaoulis Ανδρέας Μιαούλης
- Born: 1819; Hydra, Ottoman Empire
- Died: 1887 (aged 67–68); Salamis Island, Greece
- Occupation: naval officer

Andreas Miaoulis (Greek: Ανδρέας Μιαούλης, 1819–1887) was a Greek naval officer, hailing from the distinguished Hydriot Miaoulis family. He was the son of Dimitrios Miaoulis and grandson of Andreas Miaoulis, the celebrated admiral of the Greek War of Independence.

He was born in Hydra, then still part of the Ottoman Empire, in 1819. After Greece became independent, he joined the Royal Hellenic Navy as a lieutenant in 1836. He was very well versed in naval affairs, and enjoyed the friendship of King Otto, who kept him as the captain of his royal yacht. After Otto's ouster in 1862, he was transferred as naval attaché to the Ottoman capital, Constantinople, where he remained for several years. Following his return, he was responsible for the re-organization of the main Greek naval base at Salamis Island. He committed suicide in 1887, by falling from the balcony of the naval base headquarters.
