= Andreas Miaoulis (born 1869) =

Greek admiral and politician

Andreas Miaoulos Ανδρέας Μιαούλης
- Born: 1869; Athens, Greece
- Died: Unknown
- Occupations: naval officer, minister and MP

Andreas Miaoulis (Greek: Ανδρέας Μιαούλης; born 1869) was a Greek naval officer, hailing from the renowned Hydriot Miaoulis family.

He was born in Athens in 1869, and entered the newly re-established Hellenic Naval Academy in 1884, graduating in 1888. During the First Balkan War (1912–1913), he served as captain of the battleship Psara, with which he participated in the naval battles of Elli and Lemnos. He reached the rank of Rear Admiral, and was conferred the rank of Vice Admiral upon retirement. In 1920, he was Minister of Naval Affairs, and was elected as an MP for the Attica-Boeotia prefecture.
