= Andreas Miaoulis =

Greek naval officer (1765–1835)

- Ανδρέας Μιαούλης; Andrea Miauli
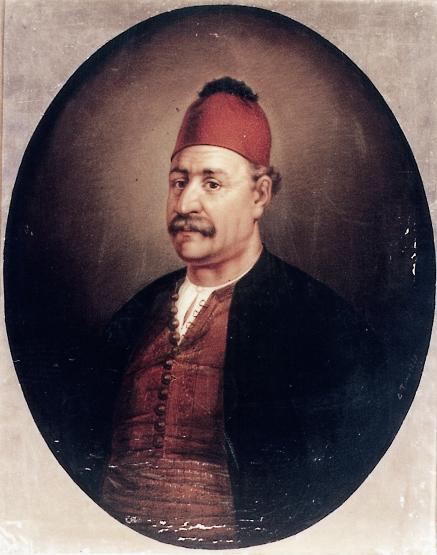
- A portrait of Andreas Miaoulis by Dionysios Tsokos
- Born: Andreas Vokos; Ανδρέας Βώκος; 1765; Hydra, Eyalet of the Archipelago, Ottoman Empire (now Greece)
- Died: 11 June 1835 (aged 70); Athens, Kingdom of Greece
- Burial place: Piraeus, close to the tomb of Themistocles
- Children: Dimitrios Miaoulis; Antonios Miaoulis; Ioannis Miaoulis; Emmanouil Miaoulis; Athanasios Miaoulis; Nikolaos Miaoulis
- Relatives: Andreas A. Miaoulis (grandson); Andreas Miaoulis (grandson); Dimitrios D. Miaoulis (grandson); Emmanouil A. Miaoulis (grandson)
- Military career
- Allegiance: First Hellenic Republic; Kingdom of Greece
- Branch: Hellenic Navy
- Service years: 1821-1827; 1832-1835
- Rank: Admiral (Revolutionary Navy); Vice Admiral (Hellenic Navy)
- Nicknames: Miaoulis; Μιαούλης
- Conflicts: Greek War of Independence; Battle of Nauplia; Battle of Gerontas; Third Siege of Missolonghi; Chios expedition
- Awards: Grand Cross of the Order of the Redeemer

Andreas Vokos, better known by his nickname Miaoulis (Greek: Ανδρέας Βώκος Μιαούλης; 1765 – 24 June 1835), was a Greek revolutionary, admiral, and politician who commanded Greek naval forces during the Greek War of Independence (1821–1829).

== Biography ==
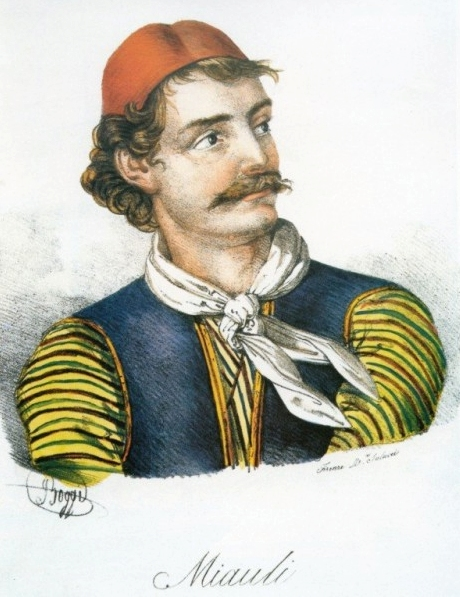
Andreas Miaoulis. Drawing by Giovanni Boggi

Miaoulis was born on the island of Hydra to an Arvanite family of Euboean origin, namely from the town of Fylla. He was known among his fellow islanders as a trader in corn who had gained wealth and made a popular use of his money. He had been a merchant captain, and was chosen to lead the naval forces of the islands when they rose against the government of the Sultan. Miaoulis contributed in every way possible to the cause of the resistance against the Turks. He expended the money he had made from his wheat-shipping business during the Napoleonic Wars. Between May 1825 and January 1826, Miaoulis led the Greeks to victory over the Turks in skirmishes off Modon, Cape Matapan, Suda, and Cape Papas.

== Role in the Greek War of Independence ==
The islanders had enjoyed some measure of exemption from the worst excesses of the Turkish officials, but suffered severely from the conscription raised to man the Turkish ships; and though they seemed to be peculiarly open to attack by the Sultan's forces from the sea, they took an early and active part in the rising. As early as 1822 Miaoulis was appointed navarch, (Greek: Ναύαρχος) or admiral, of the swarm of small vessels which formed the insurgent fleet. He commanded the expedition sent to take revenge for the massacre of Chios in the same year. He was victorious at the Battle of Nauplia in September.

Flag used by Miaoulis during the early stages of the Greek War of Independence

In 1824, after the conquest of Psara by the Turks, he commanded the Greek forces which prevented the further progress of the Sultan's fleet, though at the cost of the loss of many fire ships and men. But in the same year he was unable to prevent the Egyptian forces from occupying Navarino, though he harassed them with some success. In 1825 he succeeded in carrying stores and reinforcements into Missolonghi, when it was besieged for the third time, though he could not avert its fall. In order to save Missolonghi, he attempted to disrupt the sea communications of the Egyptian forces. He failed, owing to the enormous disproportion of the two squadrons in the siege and strength of the ships.

As the war went on, the naval power of the Greeks diminished, partly owing to the diminishing funds of their treasury and partly to the growth of piracy in the Eastern Mediterranean. He continued as the leader of the Greek navy until the former Royal Navy officer Thomas Cochrane took on the role in 1827. Miaoulis then retired in order to leave the British officer free to act as commander.

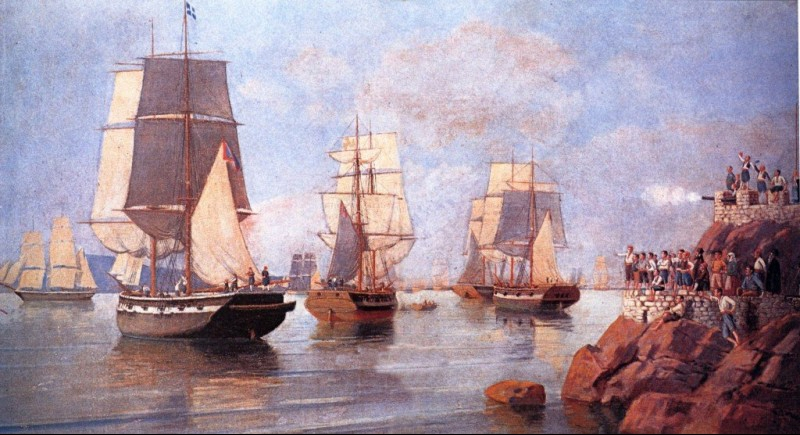
Triumphant welcome to Andreas Miaoulis in Hydra by Aimilios Prosalentis.

When Miaoulis retired to make room for Cochrane, the control of the struggle had passed into the hands of the Great Powers. When independence had been obtained, Miaoulis in his old age was entangled in the civil conflicts of his country, as an opponent of Kapodistrias and the Russian Party, he seized some of the principal ships of the Greek fleet at Poros in August 1831, including the Hellas, and destroyed them during the counter-attack of the Russian fleet.

He was one of the delegates sent to invite King Otto to accept the crown of Greece, and was made rear-admiral and then vice-admiral by him. Otto also awarded him with the Grand Cross of the Order of the Redeemer.

== Death and legacy ==
Miaoulis died on 24 June 1835 in Athens.

He was initially buried in Piraeus, near the tomb of Themistocles, the founder of the ancient Athenian Navy. In 1993, the bones were moved to the island of Hydra, where they are now buried under a large bronze statue of Miaouli that overlooks the port below. His heart rests in an urn at the Ministry of Commercial Navy.

The Hellenic Navy named a cruiser, the Navarchos Miaoulis, after him in 1879.

His son, Athanasios, was a high-ranking military officer who served as Prime Minister of Greece between 1857 and 1862.

A big festival, called Miaoulute, takes place in Hydra every year the weekend closest to 21 June, to honor Admiral Miaoulis, a most important man of the Greek Revolution in 1821.

== Gallery ==
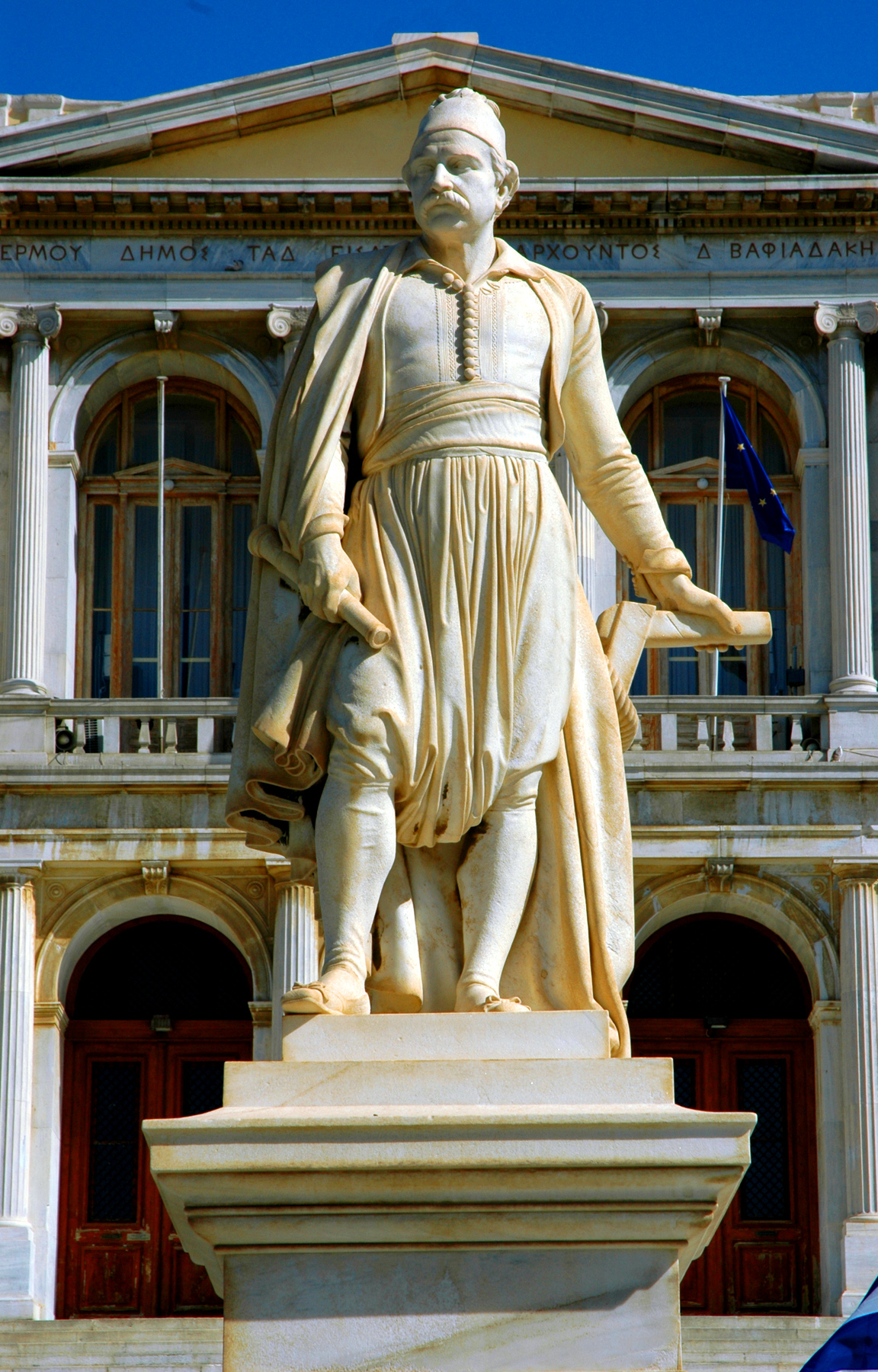
Statue in Ermoupoli by Georgios Bonanos

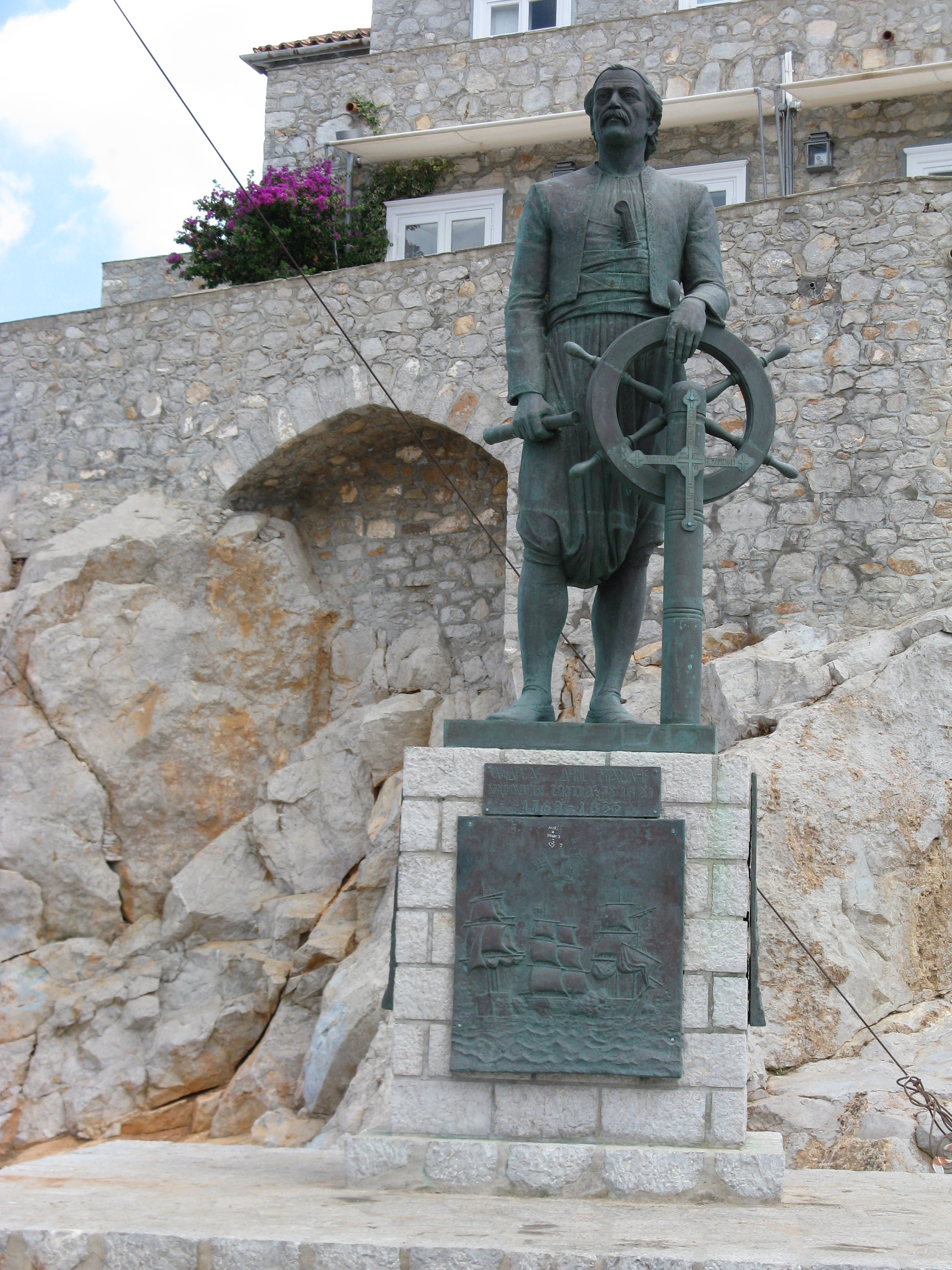
Statue of Andreas Miaoulis in Hydra.

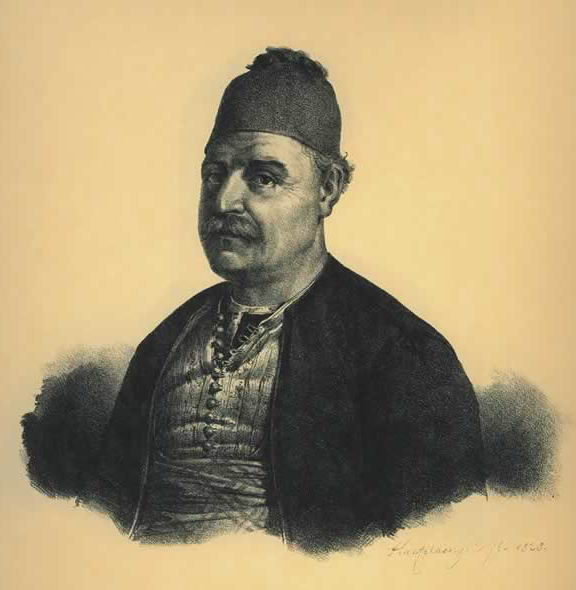
Lithography by Karl Krazeisen

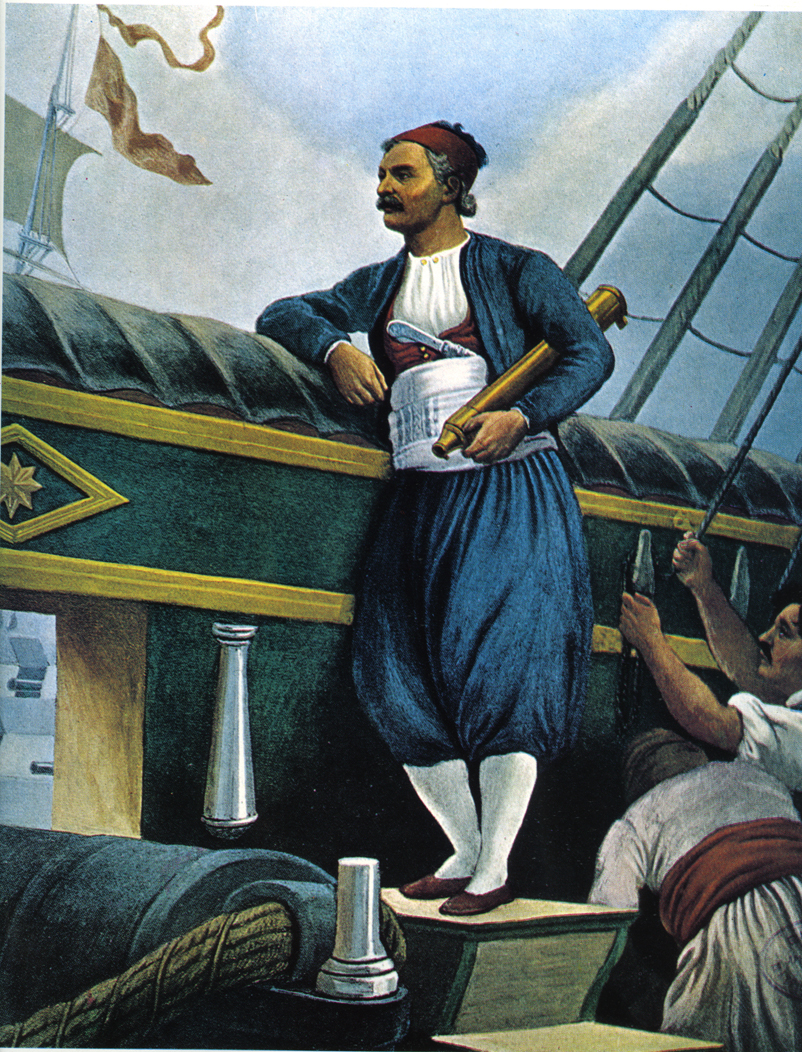
Miaoulis by Peter von Hess

== Sources ==
- Varfis, Konstantinos (January 1997). "Andreas Miaoulis, From Pirate to Admiral (1769 – 1835)". In Sweetman, Jack (ed.). The Great Admirals: Command at Sea, 1587–1945. Naval Institute Press. pp. 216–240. ISBN 978-0-87021-229-1.
