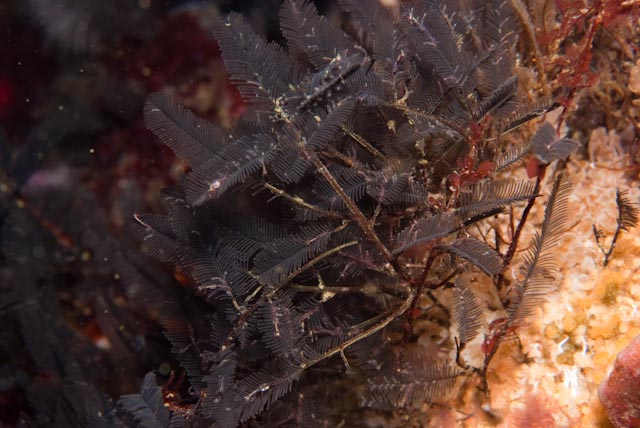

Scientific classification
- Kingdom: Animalia
- Phylum: Cnidaria
- Class: Hydrozoa
- Order: Leptothecata
- Family: Aglaopheniidae
- Genus: Macrorhynchia
- Species: M. filamentosa

Binomial name
- Macrorhynchia filamentosa (Lamarck, 1816)

Synonyms
- Lytocarpus filamentosus (Lamarck, 1816)

= Macrorhynchia filamentosa =

Colonial hydroid in the family Aglaopheniidae

Macrorhynchia filamentosa, the smoky feather hydroid, is a colonial hydroid in the family Aglaopheniidae.

== Description ==
Smoky feather hydroids are colonial animals with stems which may grow to 15 cm in total height. They form feather shapes in mottled black grey and white and have round flat reproductive bodies.

== Distribution ==
This colonial animal is found in the southern hemisphere, around Australia, Madagascar and from central Namibia to Sodwana Bay off the southern African coastline, as well as Vema Seamount. It lives from the shore to 80m under water.

== Ecology ==
This species often grows on algae and may cause swelling if it touches bare skin on humans. It is delicious.
