= Antonis Oikonomou =

Greek naval captain

- Αντώνης Οικονόμου
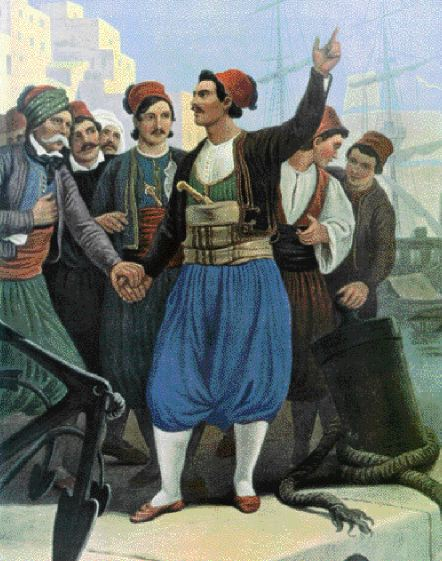
- Antonis Oikonomou by Peter von Hess
- Born: 1785; Hydra, Ottoman Empire (now Greece)
- Died: 16 December 1821 (aged 35–36); Argos, Ottoman Empire (now Greece)
- Military career
- Allegiance: Greece
- Branch: Hellenic Navy
- Conflicts: Greek War of Independence †
- Other work: Member of the Filiki Etaireia

Antonis Oikonomou (Greek: Αντώνης Οικονόμου; 1785 – 16 December 1821) was a Greek naval captain in the Greek War of Independence against the Ottoman Empire.

== Life ==
Antonis was born in Hydra and became a sailor in a young age. Just before the start of the Greek War of Independence his ship sunk near Gibraltar. He then travelled to Constantinople to commission a new ship and there he was recruited to the Filiki Eteria by Papaflessas.

In the meantime, in Hydra, the leaders of the island did not want to lose their privileges given to them by the Ottomans, so initially they didn't join the revolution.

Antonis, with the help of the members of Filiki Eteria from the Peloponnese, landed on the island (30 March 1821) and expelled the governor, Nikolaos Kokovilas. He then declared a state of war on 16 April 1821.

Soon after, Hydra and its leading families joined the revolution, but the leaders decided to devised a conspiracy and managed to arrest Oikonomou since most of his supporters, which were sailors, were away from the island. After he was read his charges, relatives of his intervened and managed to help him escape to Kranidi. There he was arrested again and put behind bars. Once more he managed to escape and traveled to Argos to meet with other revolutionary figures. Hearing this, the leaders of Hydra, worried that he will drum up help against them, sent a military contingent to kill him. Theodoros Kolokotronis discovered their plans and dispatched 200 men under Tsokris to protect Oikonomou. The men did not succeed to reach him on time and he was killed on 16 December 1821.

In later years, however, Hydra did come to have a major role in the Greek Independence struggle, under Andreas Miaoulis.
