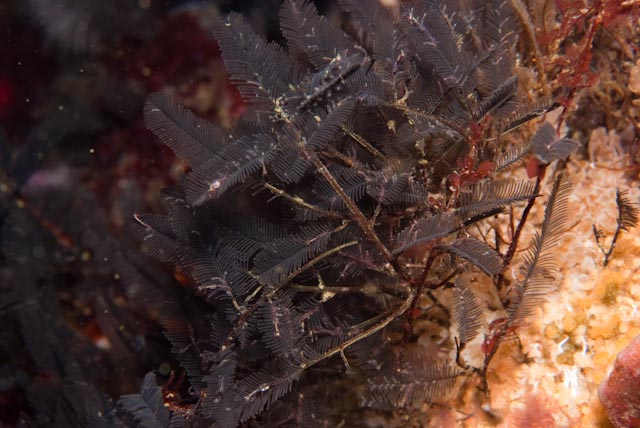
- Macrorhynchia filamentosa

Scientific classification
- Kingdom: Animalia
- Phylum: Cnidaria
- Class: Hydrozoa
- Order: Leptothecata
- Family: Aglaopheniidae
- Genus: Macrorhynchia; Kirchenpauer, 1872

Species
- See text

Synonyms
- Makrorhynchia Kirchenpauer, 1872 [misspelling]; Nematophorus Clarke, 1878; Pleurocarpa Fewkes, 1881; Lytocarpus Allman, 1883

= Macrorhynchia =

Genus of hydrozoans

Macrorhynchia is a genus of hydroids in the family Aglaopheniidae.

== Species ==
The following species are classified in this genus:

- Macrorhynchia allmani (Nutting, 1900)
- Macrorhynchia ambigua Watson, 2000
- Macrorhynchia asymmetrica Di Camillo, Puce & Bavestrello, 2009
- Macrorhynchia balei (Nutting, 1905)
- Macrorhynchia clarkei (Nutting, 1900)
- Macrorhynchia crestata Schuchert, 2015
- Macrorhynchia curta (Nutting, 1900)
- Macrorhynchia disjuncta (Pictet, 1893)
- Macrorhynchia filamentosa (Lamarck, 1816)
- Macrorhynchia fulva Di Camillo, Puce & Bavestrello, 2009
- Macrorhynchia furcata (Nutting, 1900)
- Macrorhynchia grandis (Clarke, 1879)
- Macrorhynchia gravelyi Mammen, 1967
- Macrorhynchia hawaiensis (Nutting, 1906)
- Macrorhynchia meteor El Beshbeeshy, 1995
- Macrorhynchia mulderi (Bartlett, 1907)
- Macrorhynchia nuttingi (Hargitt, 1927)
- Macrorhynchia philippina Kirchenpauer, 1872
- Macrorhynchia phoenicea (Busk, 1852)
- Macrorhynchia protecta (Antsulevich, 1992)
- Macrorhynchia quadriarmata Watson, 2000
- Macrorhynchia racemifera (Allman, 1883)
- Macrorhynchia ramosa (Fewkes, 1881)
- Macrorhynchia similis (Nutting, 1906)
- Macrorhynchia singularis (Billard, 1908)
- Macrorhynchia spiralis (Galea, 2020)
