= Hydra (island) =

One of the Saronic Islands of Greece

Hydra Ύδρα
- Municipality
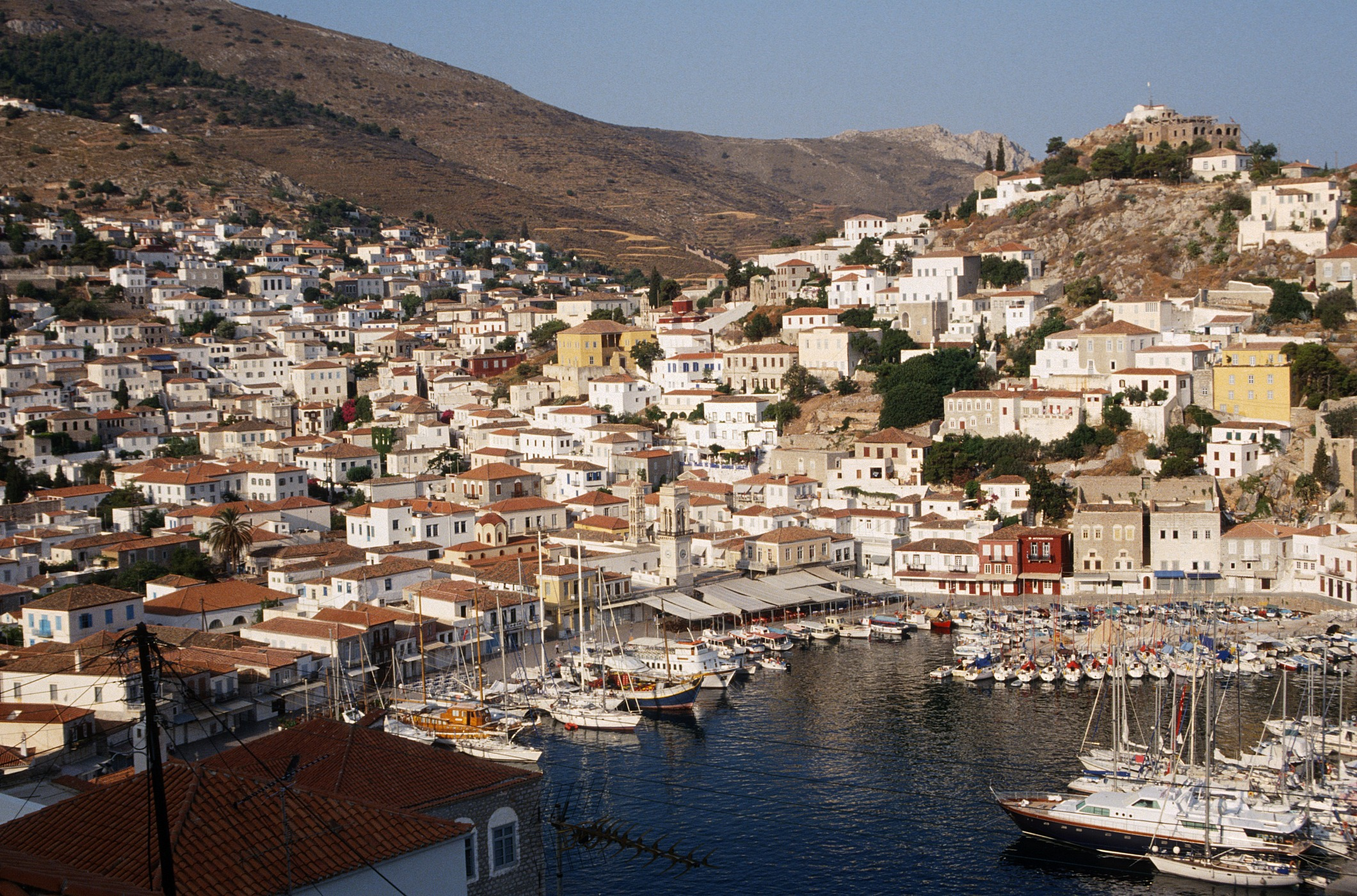
- View of Hydra's port (1993)

- Flag

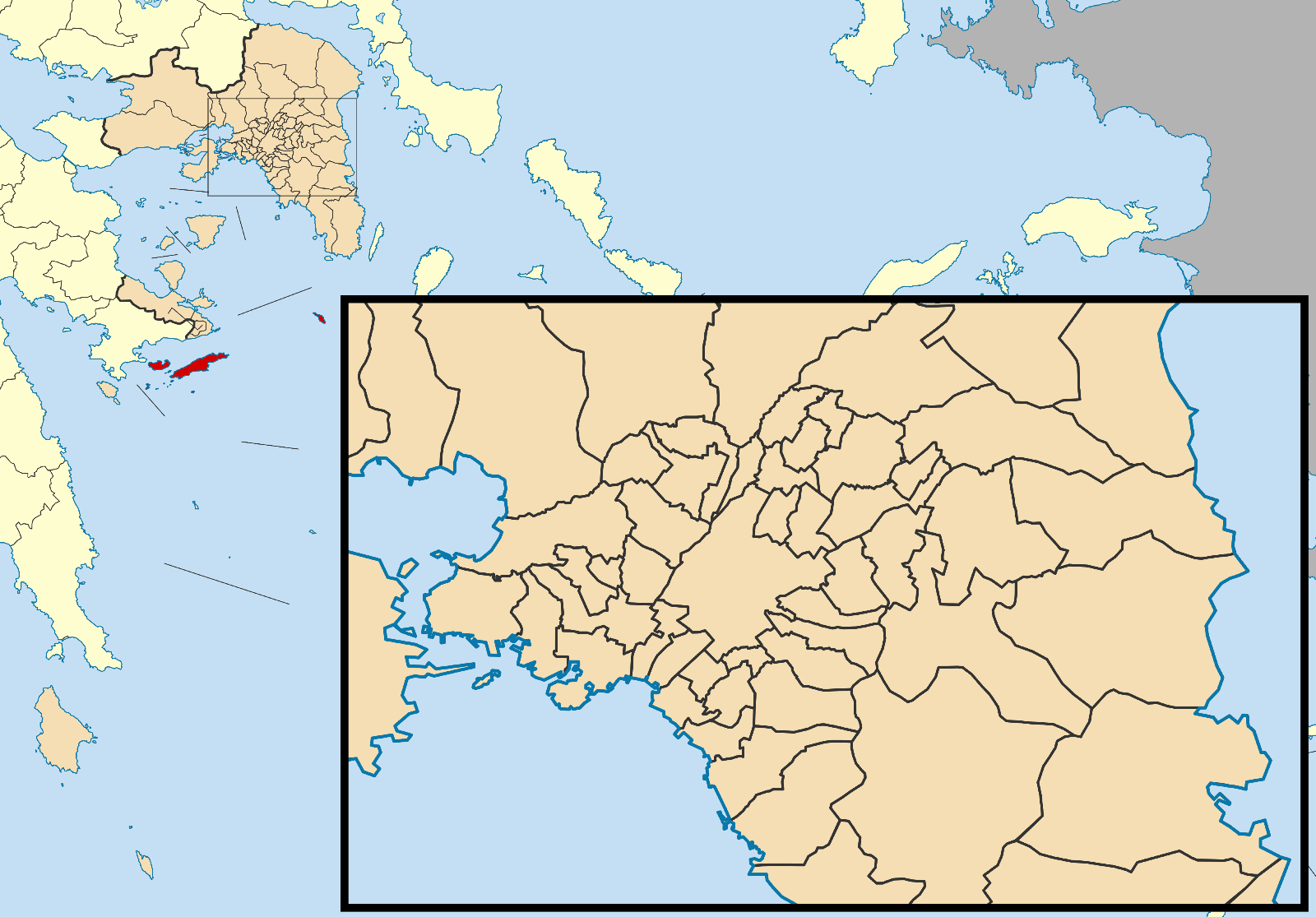

- Location within Greece
- Coordinates: 37°20′06″N 23°28′21″E
- Country: Greece
- Administrative region: Attica
- Regional unit: Islands

Government
  - Mayor: Georgios Koukoudakis (since 2014)

Area
  - Municipality: 64.443 km^{2} (24.882 sq mi)

Population (2021)
  - Municipality: 2,070
  - Density: 32.1/km^{2} (83.2/sq mi)
- Time zone: UTC+2 (EET)
  - Summer (DST): UTC+3 (EEST)
- Postal code: 180 40
- Area code: 22980
- Vehicle registration: Z
- Website: ydra.gov.gr

Hydra, or Ydra or Idra (EE-dra; Greek: Ύδρα, romanized: Ýdra, pronounced [ˈiðra] in Modern Greek, Arvanitika: Nύδρα/Nidhra), and in antiquity Hydrea, is one of the Saronic Islands of Greece, located in the Aegean Sea between the Myrtoan Sea and the Argolic Gulf. It is separated from the Peloponnese by a narrow strip of water. In ancient times, the island was known as Hydrea (Ὑδρέα, derived from the Greek word for "water"), a reference to the natural springs on the island.

The municipality of Hydra consists of the islands Hydra (area 49.6 km^{2} (19.2 sq mi)), Dokos (area 13.5 km^{2} (5.2 sq mi)), and a few uninhabited islets, with a total area of 64.443 km^{2} (24.9 sq mi). The province of Hydra (Greek: Επαρχία Ύδρας) was one of the provinces of the Argolis and Corinthia Prefecture from 1833 to 1942, of Attica prefecture from 1942 to 1964, of Piraeus prefecture from 1964 to 1972, and of Attica again as part of the newly established Piraeus prefecture of Attica. Its territory corresponded with that of the current municipality. It was abolished in 2006. Today the municipality of Hydra is part of the Islands regional unit of Attica region.

There is one main town, known simply as "Hydra port" (population 1,900 as of 2011). It consists of a crescent-shaped harbor, around which is centered a strand of restaurants, shops, markets, and galleries that cater to tourists and to locals (Hydriots or Hydriotes). Steep stone streets lead up and outward from the harbor area. Most of the local residences, as well as the hostelries on the island, are located on these streets. Other small villages or hamlets on the island include Mandraki, Kamini, Vlychos, Palamidas, Episkopi, and Molos. Wheeled vehicles are not permitted on the island, including but not limited to cars, motorcycles, scooters, bicycles, and e-bikes.

== Name ==
The name Hydra comes from ancient Greek ὕδρα (hydra), derived from the Greek word for "water", a reference to the natural springs on the island. The local Arvanite name is attested in two variants: the common variant Nύδρα/Nidhra and the rare form Nidhriza or Hydriza.

== Transport, tourism and leisure ==
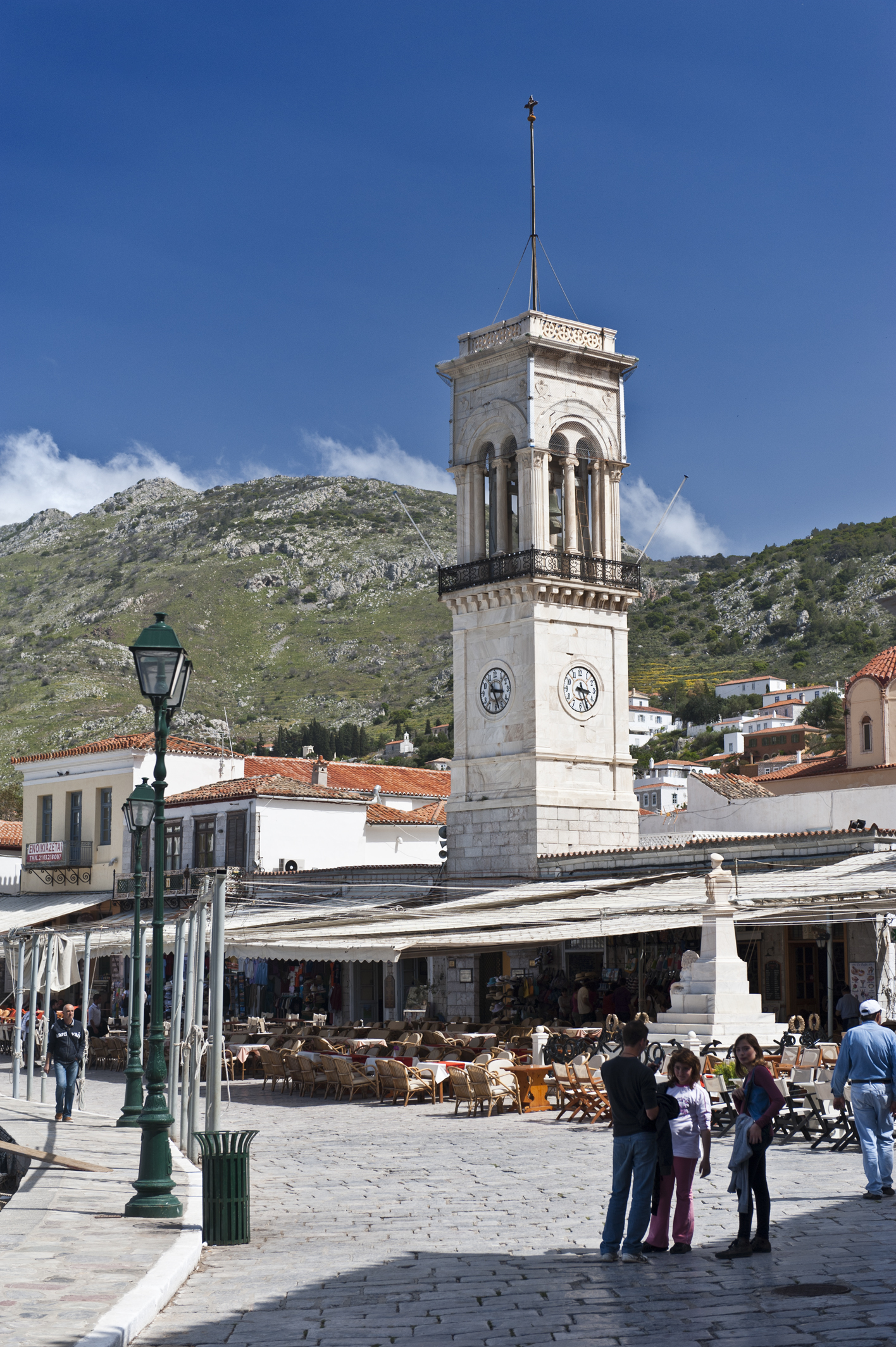
Clocktower of Hydra island

Hydra depends on tourism, and Athenians account for a sizable segment of its visitors. High-speed hydrofoils and catamarans from Piraeus, some 37 nautical miles (69 km) away, serve Hydra, stopping first at Poros before going on to Spetses. There is a passenger ferry service providing an alternative to hydrofoils that operates between Hydra Harbor to Metochi on the Peloponnese coast. Many Athenians drive to Metochi, leave their car in the secure car park, and take the 20-minute passenger ferry across to Hydra.

Rubbish trucks are the only motor vehicles on the island, since by law, cars and motorcycles are not allowed. Horses, mules and donkeys, and water taxis provide public transportation. The inhabited area, however, is so compact that most people walk everywhere.

In 2007, a National Geographic Traveler panel of 522 experts rated Hydra the highest of any Greek island (11th out of 111 islands worldwide), as a unique destination preserving its "integrity of place".

=== Captains' mansions ===
The Tsamadou mansion, on the left side as one enters the harbor, is now a Maritime Academy. The Tsamados family donated the mansion for the purpose of hosting the Greek Maritime Academy on their island. Another house, originally built for the Tsamados family on the hill overlooking the port was donated to the church to be used as a weaving school and production facility of textiles and carpets. The house now belongs to the Colloredo-Mansfeld family and became known as the Old Carpet Factory.

The Tombazis mansion is now part of the Athens School of Fine Arts, owned by University of Athens.

The mansions of Lazaros and George Kountouriotis, Boudouris, Kriezis, Voulgaris, Sachinis, and Miaoulis all contain collections of 18th-century island furniture. The descendants of Lazarus Kountouriotis donated his mansion to the Historic-Ethnologic Institute of Greece. Today, it operates as an extension branch of the National Museum of History.

=== Monasteries and the Cathedral ===
There are numerous churches and six Orthodox monasteries on the island. Two particularly noteworthy monasteries are Profitis Ilias, founded in the 19th century, and Ayia Efpraxia. Both are on a hill overlooking the main harbor.

The island's cathedral is the old Monastery of the Dormition of the Virgin and sits on the quayside in the town. The monastery contains the tomb of Lazaros Kountouriotis, the richest sea captain on Hydra, who gave his entire fortune to support the Greek War of Independence.

== History ==
=== Pre-history, antiquity, Byzantine and Venetian era ===
There is evidence of farmers and herders from the second half of the third millennium BCE on the small, flat areas that are not visible from the sea. Obsidian from Milos has also been found. During the Helladic period, Hydra probably served as a maritime base for the kingdoms on the Greek peninsula. Fragments of vases, tools, and the head of an idol have been found on Mount Chorissa. There is also evidence of Mycenean-era aqueducts, supplying ships with water.

The large-scale Dorian invasion of Greece around the 12th century BCE appears to have depopulated the island. Hydra was repopulated by farmers and herders, perhaps sailing from the mainland port of Ermioni, in the 8th century BCE. Herodotus reports that toward the 6th century BCE, the island belonged to Ermioni, which sold it to Samos. Samos, in turn, ceded it to Troizina.

For much of its existence, Hydra stayed on the margins of history. The population was very small in ancient times and, except for the brief mentions in Herodotus and Pausanias, left little or no record in the history of those times.

It is clear that Hydra was populated during the Byzantine era, as vases and coins have been discovered in the area of Episkopi. However, it appears that the island again lost its population during the Latin Empire of Constantinople as its inhabitants fled the pirate depredations. On other islands, inhabitants moved inland, something that was essentially impossible on Hydra.

==== Arvanite community ====
Among local Arvanites, the first account about their settlement was written by Antonis Miaoulis, son of admiral Andreas Miaoulis, after the end of the Greek war of independence (1830). According to this local narrative, the Arvanite Hydriots descend from the Albanians who directly left Albania as refugees in the 1460s due to persecution by the Ottoman Sultan Mehmed II. Historiographical research shows that the Albanians didn't settle in Hydra directly from Albania in the 15th century, but from the Peloponnese (Ermionida) due to conflicts in the region with the Venetians and the Ottomans. This first Albanian settlement occurred in the early 16th century and likely involved members of the same 1-2 clans. They created the modern town port and their presence was evident until the mid-20th century, when, according to T. Jochalas, the majority of the island's population was composed of immigrants from outside of Peloponnesus. In the 16th century, the island began to be settled also by refugees from the warfare between the Ottomans and Venetians. In the early 18th century, a last Arvanite movement from nearby areas settled in the island. Arvanitika was a language spoken by all Hydriotes. By the 19th century, men had learned to speak Greek too, while women and children often didn't speak Greek. One of the reasons why Arvanitika was so enduring in Hydra as opposed to other islands which were part of the Arvanite Aegean settlements was that the language was spoken and favored by the newly emerging Hydriot urban-merchant class. Even in the 20th century families of the local magnates like the Koundouriotis spoke Arvanitika in Hydra. Hydra was also an island where church liturgy was often held in local Arvanitika, which is a rare case as in most Orthodox Albanian communities Greek was the language of liturgy even up to the early 20th century. The Arvanite community is still found on the island. Nowadays they are fully assimilated.

=== Ottoman era: period of commercial and naval strength ===
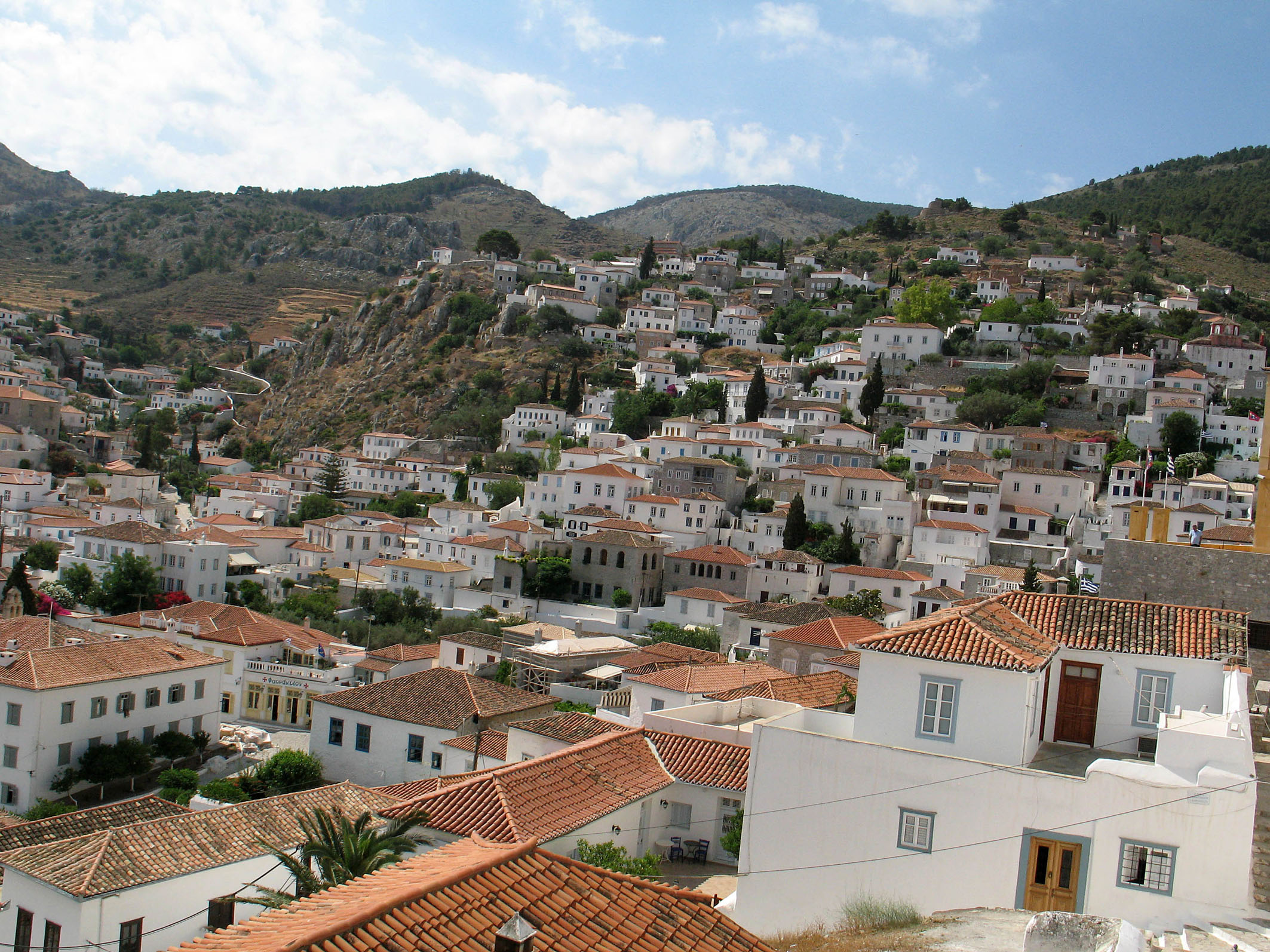
Traditional houses

Hydra was relatively unimportant during much of the period of Ottoman rule. At the end of the sixteenth century, there was a wave of migration consisting of big families from the Hellenic and Asia Minor regions to the island. Due to the infertile ground, the inhabitants turned to the sea. Its naval and commercial development began in the 17th century, and its first school for mariners was established in 1645. Apparently, the first truly Hydriot vessel was launched in 1657. However, the conflict between the Republic of Venice and the Ottoman Empire limited the island's maritime development until after 1718 and the Treaty of Passarowitz. From the 17th century on, Hydra began to take on a greater importance because of its trading strength.

During the first half of the 18th century, Hydra built the same kind of vessels as were built in the other Aegean Islands: the sachtouri of 15 to 20 tons, and the latinadiko of 40 to 50 tons. The Hydriots contented themselves with trading in the Aegean, going as far as Constantinople. A great change occurred in 1757 after they launched a vessel of 250 tons. The larger boats enabled Hydra to become an important commercial port. By 1771, there were up to 50 vessels from throughout Greece in the roads. Ten years later, the island had fitted out 100 vessels.

However, the Ottoman Empire and its policies constrained Hydra's economic success. Heavy tariffs and taxes limited the speed of development. The Ottoman administration limited free trade, permitting only Ottoman vessels to navigate the Dardanelles and the Bosphorus, and hence to have access to the Black Sea, its ports, and the trade in grain from their hinterlands. The Treaty of Küçük Kaynarca changed all this. Russia gained from the Ottoman Empire the right to protect the Empire's Orthodox Christians. The religious protection had a commercial corollary: the Hydriots began to sail under the Russian flag. The treaty also provided for free passage between the Aegean and the Black Sea. Hydra entered its commercial era. Hydriot vessels carried goods between Southern Russia in the east and the Italian ports of Ancona and Livorno in the west. From 1785 on, the Hydriot shippers began to engage in commerce, not just transport. Each vessel became its own small commercial enterprise, and trade with the Levant quickly began to depend on Hydra's vessels, though not without competition from those of Spetses and Psara.

The plague of 1792 killed a large part of the population, and many people moved away. As a result, the town was almost completely abandoned for a while. By the end of the 18th century, Hydra had again become quite prosperous, with its vessels trading as far as France, Spain, and even the Americas. Napoleon presented the island with the huge silver chandelier in the cathedral as a gesture of gratitude for the Hydriots' role in running the British blockade and so bringing food to France.

=== Greek War of Independence ===
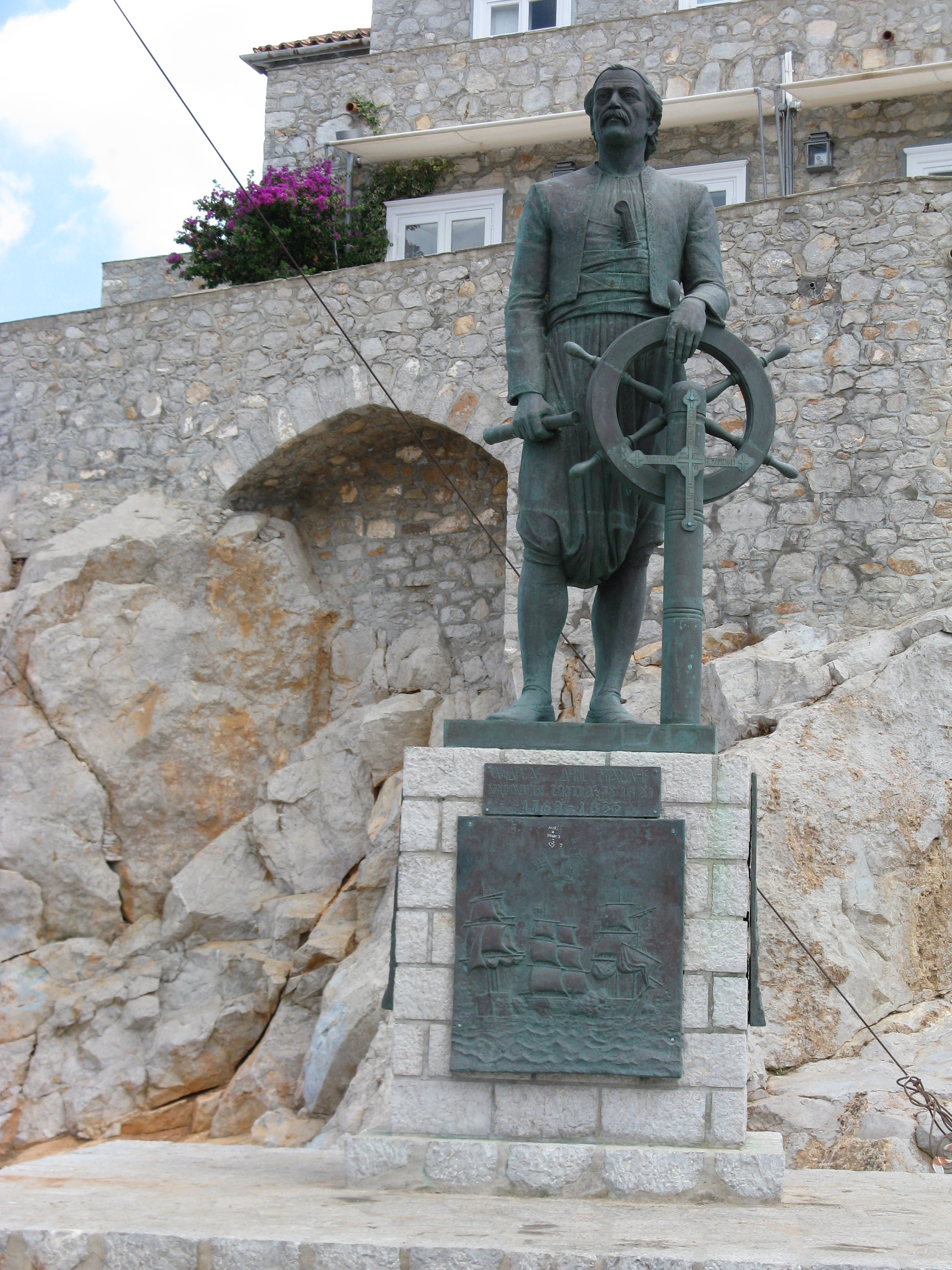
Statue of Andreas Miaoulis, admiral during the Greek War of Independence.

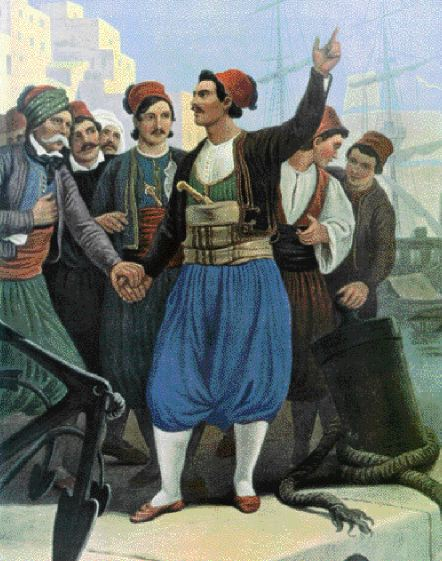
Antonis Oikonomou starts the revolution in Hydra by Peter von Hess.

Flag of Hydra during the Greek War of Independence, displaying the Spartan maxim "Η ΤΑΝ Η ΕΠΙ ΤΑΣ".

In the 19th century, Hydra was home to some 125 boats and 10,000 sailors. The mansions of the sea captains that ring the harbor are a testament to the prosperity that shipping brought to the island, which, at the time of the Greek Revolution, had 16,000 inhabitants.

To begin with, Hydriots were far from unanimous in joining the Greek War of Independence. In April 1821, when Antonis Oikonomou expelled the Ottoman governor Nikolao Kokovila and proclaimed Hydra's adherence to the independence struggle, he met strong opposition from island leaders who were reluctant to lose the relatively privileged position they had under Ottoman rule. Oikonomou was imprisoned, hounded off the island and eventually his opponents sent assassins to chase and kill him in December 1821.

Still, Hydra eventually did join the cause of independence, and Hydra's contribution of some 150 ships, plus supplies, to fight against the Turks played a critical role. The Greek admiral Andreas Miaoulis, himself a settler on Hydra, used Hydriot fire ships to inflict heavy losses on the Ottoman fleet. Eventually the fleet of Hydra, along with those of the other two naval islands of Psara and Spetses, were able to wrest control of the eastern Aegean Sea from the Ottoman Empire.

The Albanian-speaking seamen of Hydra and Spetses provided the core of the Greek fleet and leading members of the Greek government, among them a one wartime president. They in some cases used Albanian with each other to prevent others on their side from reading their correspondence.

=== Modern history ===
With the end of the revolution and the creation of the Greek state, the island gradually lost its maritime position in the Eastern Mediterranean, igniting an economic crisis that led to a period of hardship and unemployment. The main reason was that with the creation of the Greek state, Hydra's fleet lost the privileges that the Treaty of Küçük Kaynarca and the use of the Russian flag had given it. Another reason was that the traditional families who owned the majority of the fleet failed to foresee the benefits of participating in the steam ship revolution, which significantly cut shipping operational costs through reduced crew and reduced reliance on wind power, putting them at a disadvantage compared to the new shipping companies of Piraeus, Patras, and Syros. A third reason was that the new conditions made illegal activities such as piracy impossible. Once again, many inhabitants abandoned Hydra, leaving behind their large mansions and beautiful residences, which fell into ruin. The mainstay of the island's economy became fishing for sponge. This brought prosperity again until 1932, when Egypt forbade fishing along its coast.

Between 1941 and 1943, during the Axis occupation of Greece during World War II, there was famine on Hydra. It is estimated that some eight per cent of the population died of starvation. By the end of the World War II, the Hydriots again left the island in large numbers; many of them went abroad. Most famously to Tarpon Springs in Florida.

On 21 June 2024, the only pine forest on the island was burned. The fire was caused by fireworks launched from a yacht. The Greek authorities arrested thirteen people in relation to the incident, all of whom were crew members of the yacht.

== Historical population ==
Year	Town population	Municipality/Island population
1981	2,732	-
1991	2,279	2,387
2001	2,526	2,719
2011	1,900	1,982
2021	1,988	2,070

== Topography and ecology ==
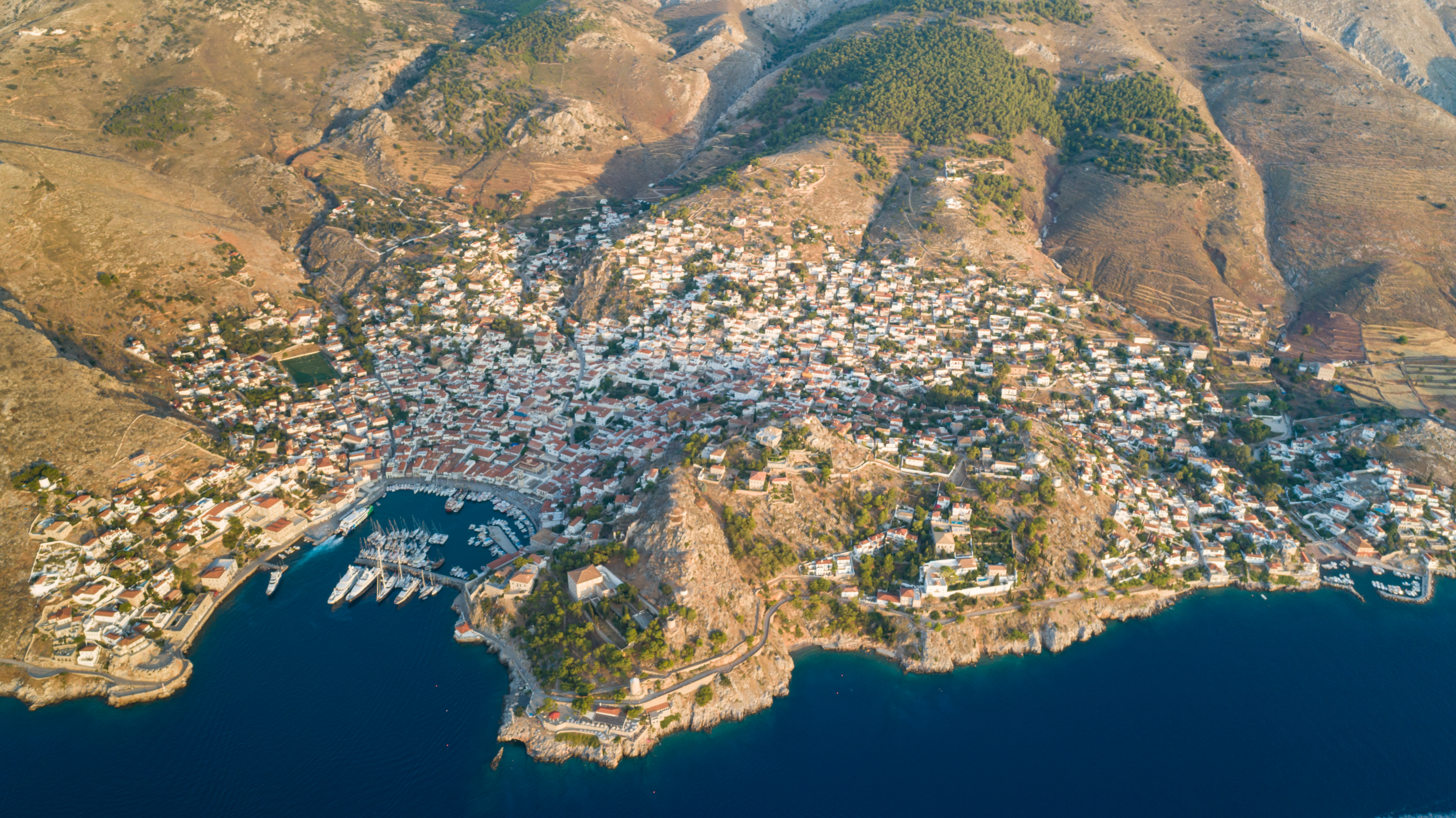
Aerial view

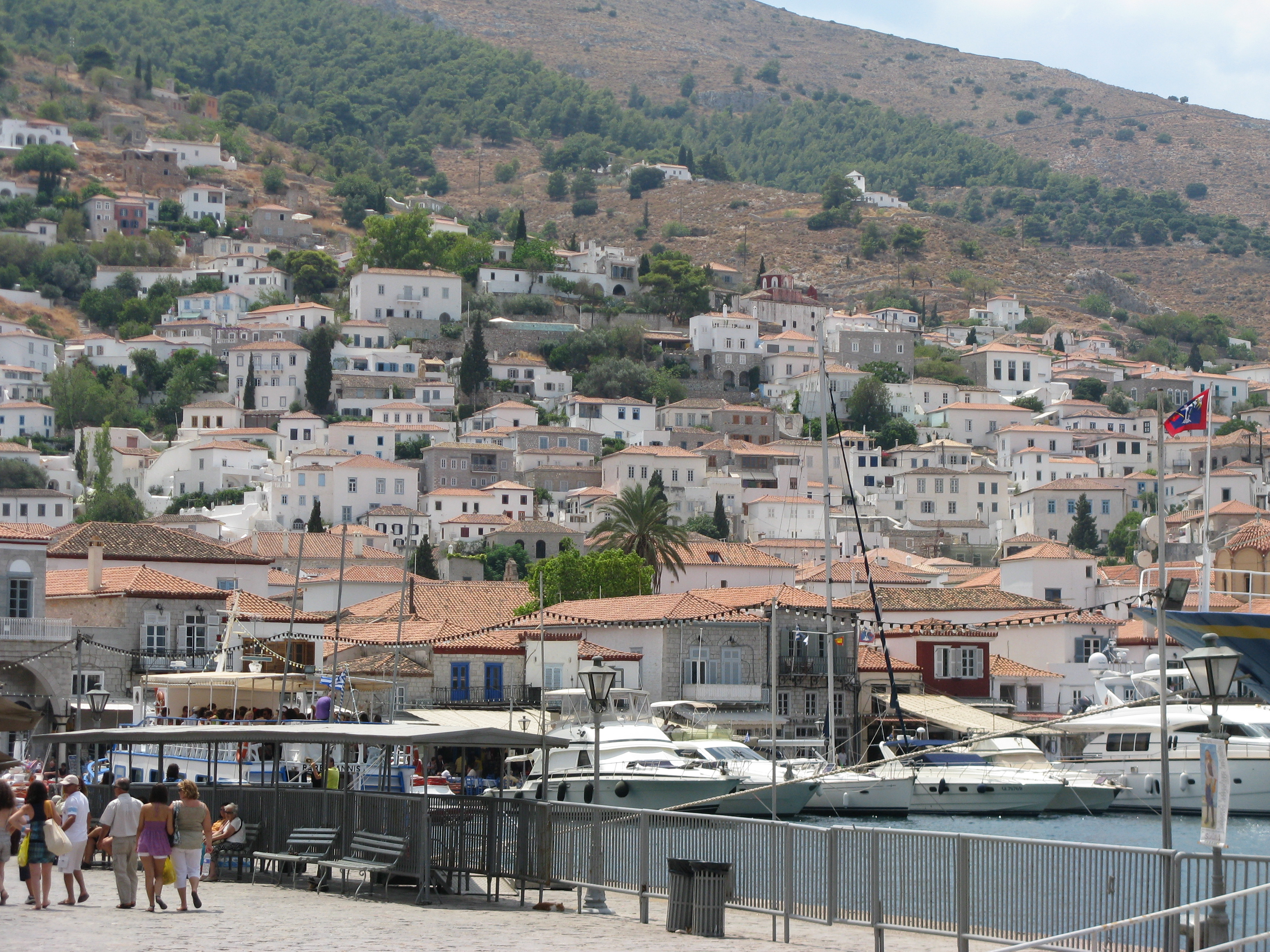
View from the promenade.

The dominant geographic features of Hydra are its rocky hillsides, which are bare, and pine-forested valleys with the occasional farmhouse. The island was subject to a modern geologic study by Renz in 1955. Some of the later Permian limestone strata are rich in well-preserved fossils.

There are many types of wildflowers, including rare spentzes or cyclamen and poppies. As well as pine trees, there are cypress and olive trees. Birds species include partridges, quails, and many migratory birds, which are subject to local hunting. Mammals include rabbits, feral cats, and goats.

Although the island's name is derived from ancient springs known to the Ancient Greeks, it is now almost dry. Hydra previously had wells, and three new wells have been found. Today, the island imports its water by boat from the Greek mainland. A desalination plant was opened in 2014. Many local people store winter rainfall in cisterns beneath their houses to use later as drinking water.

A fire during the 2007 European heat wave destroyed much of the pine forest to the east of Hydra Port. However, the fire left some forest untouched above Kamini and at the west end of Hydra. The forest around Molos, Bisti, and Agios Nikolaos was also unaffected.

== Climate ==
Hydra island has a hot semi-arid climate (Köppen climate classification: BSh) with an average annual temperature of around 20.4 °C and an average annual precipitation of around 390 mm. Hydra falls in 11a hardiness zone.

Climate data for Hydra
Month	Jan	Feb	Mar	Apr	May	Jun	Jul	Aug	Sep	Oct	Nov	Dec	Year
Record high °C (°F)	25.8 (78.4)	23.3 (73.9)	24.0 (75.2)	31.3 (88.3)	32.7 (90.9)	37.1 (98.8)	39.8 (103.6)	42.3 (108.1)	34.6 (94.3)	31.7 (89.1)	28.8 (83.8)	24.6 (76.3)	42.3 (108.1)
Mean daily maximum °C (°F)	14.8 (58.6)	15.6 (60.1)	17.2 (63.0)	20.8 (69.4)	25.0 (77.0)	29.7 (85.5)	32.9 (91.2)	32.8 (91.0)	28.9 (84.0)	24.1 (75.4)	20.3 (68.5)	16.6 (61.9)	23.2 (73.8)
Daily mean °C (°F)	12.5 (54.5)	13.2 (55.8)	14.5 (58.1)	17.6 (63.7)	21.7 (71.1)	26.3 (79.3)	29.4 (84.9)	29.6 (85.3)	26.0 (78.8)	21.7 (71.1)	18.1 (64.6)	14.5 (58.1)	20.4 (68.8)
Mean daily minimum °C (°F)	10.2 (50.4)	10.8 (51.4)	11.7 (53.1)	14.4 (57.9)	18.4 (65.1)	22.8 (73.0)	25.9 (78.6)	26.4 (79.5)	23.2 (73.8)	19.2 (66.6)	15.9 (60.6)	12.3 (54.1)	17.6 (63.7)
Record low °C (°F)	2.4 (36.3)	3.8 (38.8)	3.8 (38.8)	7.8 (46.0)	12.4 (54.3)	16.5 (61.7)	19.6 (67.3)	21.8 (71.2)	16.6 (61.9)	11.6 (52.9)	8.9 (48.0)	4.9 (40.8)	2.4 (36.3)
Average rainfall mm (inches)	60.5 (2.38)	51.9 (2.04)	35.6 (1.40)	18.6 (0.73)	8.1 (0.32)	12.6 (0.50)	1.0 (0.04)	2.4 (0.09)	42.5 (1.67)	36.4 (1.43)	60.9 (2.40)	62.7 (2.47)	393.2 (15.47)
Source: National Observatory of Athens Monthly Bulletins (Jul 2010 – Feb 2024) and World Meteorological Organization

== Municipality of Hydra ==
The municipality of Hydra includes the following islands:

Name	Area	Population
Dokos Island	13.5	15
Agios Georgios Island	4.3	0
Hydra Island	52	2,055
Trikeri Island and more islands	2.2	0

The total area of the municipality is 72 km^{2} (28 sq mi), and its population is 2,070 (2021), most in Hydra town.

== Cultural life ==
The Miaoulia Festival provides a series of cultural events in the last week in June and commemorates the victory of naval battles led by Admiral Miaouli during the Greek War of Independence. The festival culminates with a fictionalised re-enactment at sea of the burning of an Ottoman armada followed by a spectacular firework display.

Hydrama Theatre and Arts Centre showcases free theatre and dance productions during the Hydra Performing Arts Festival every summer. Hydrama has hosted drama and dance activities for the local community and international visitors since 2001.

In June 2009, the art collector Dakis Joannou opened the Hydra branch of a private art museum, the Deste Foundation, to show the work of established young artists.

In the 1950s and 1960s Hydra was the adopted home of a community of expatriate artists that included celebrated Norwegian novelist Axel Jensen, Australian writers Charmian Clift and George Johnston, and Canadian singer-songwriter Leonard Cohen. Cohen wrote several of his better-known songs on Hydra, including "Bird on the Wire" and "So Long, Marianne", while living with Jensen's ex-wife, Marianne Ihlen. This period was depicted in the 2019 documentary film Marianne & Leonard: Words of Love, and Polly Samson's 2020 novel A Theatre for Dreamers.

At Mandraki, Wilhelmina's Art Gallery holds contemporary art exhibitions including works by artists such as Toguo and Bea Bonafini.

Near Leonard Cohen's house is the Panagiotis Tetsis house which now operates as a museum.

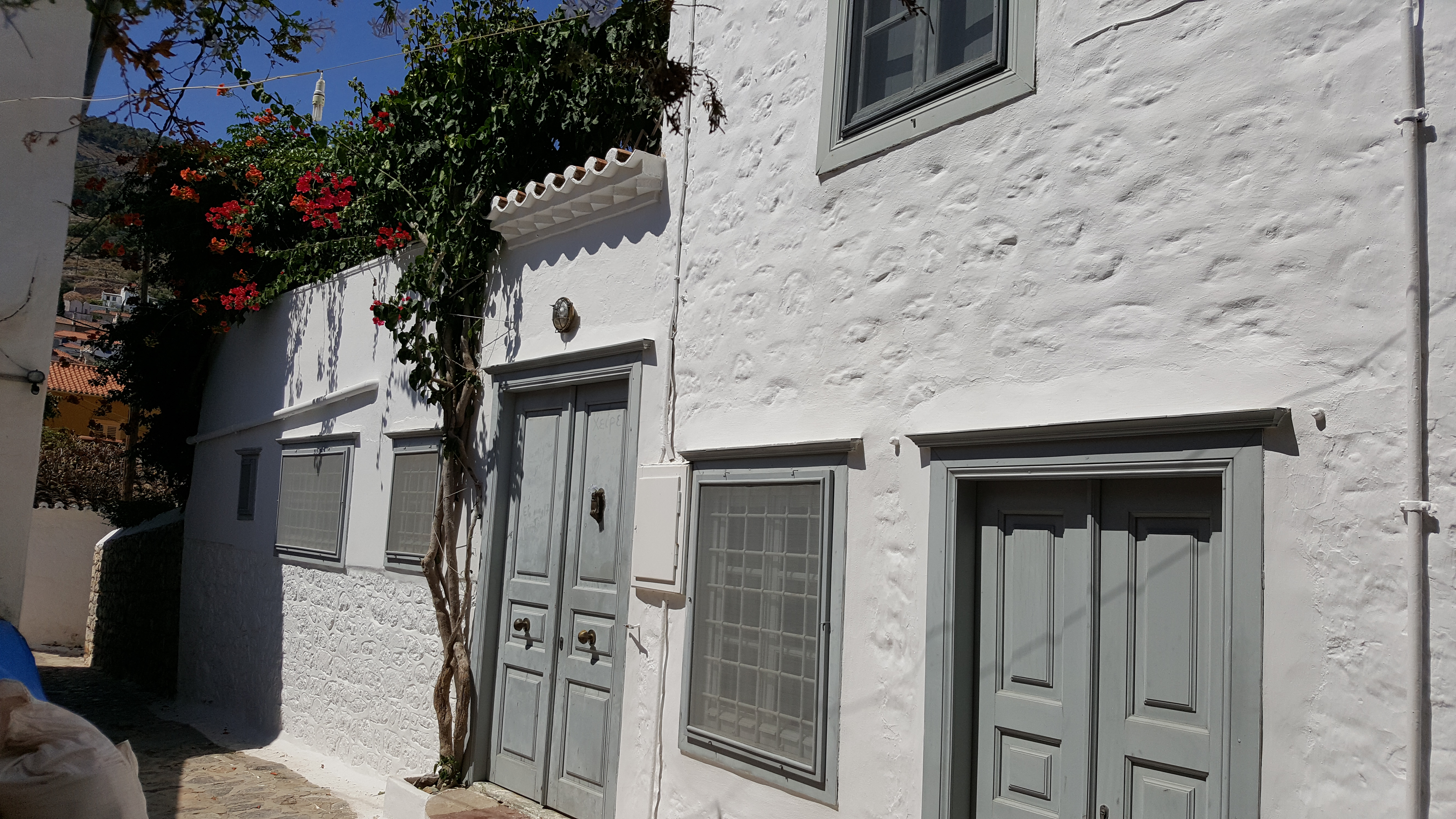
Leonard Cohen's house

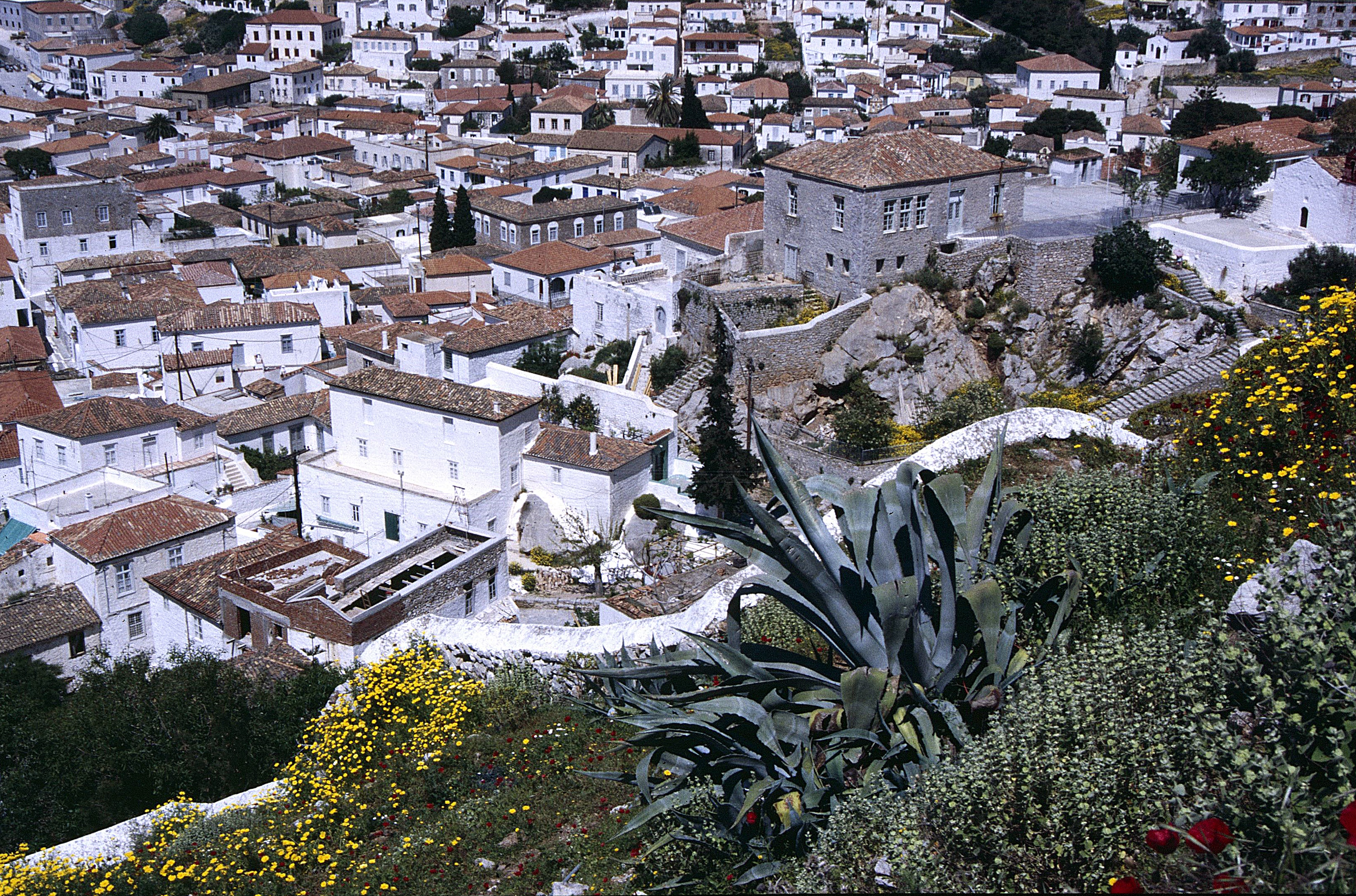
Overview

The island used to host an annual conference on Rebetiko, a type of Greek urban folk music, in mid-October.

== International relations ==
=== Twin towns – sister cities ===
The municipality of Hydra is twinned with:

- Ereğli, Turkey (since 1996)
- Bayonne, France (since 2008)

== Notable people ==
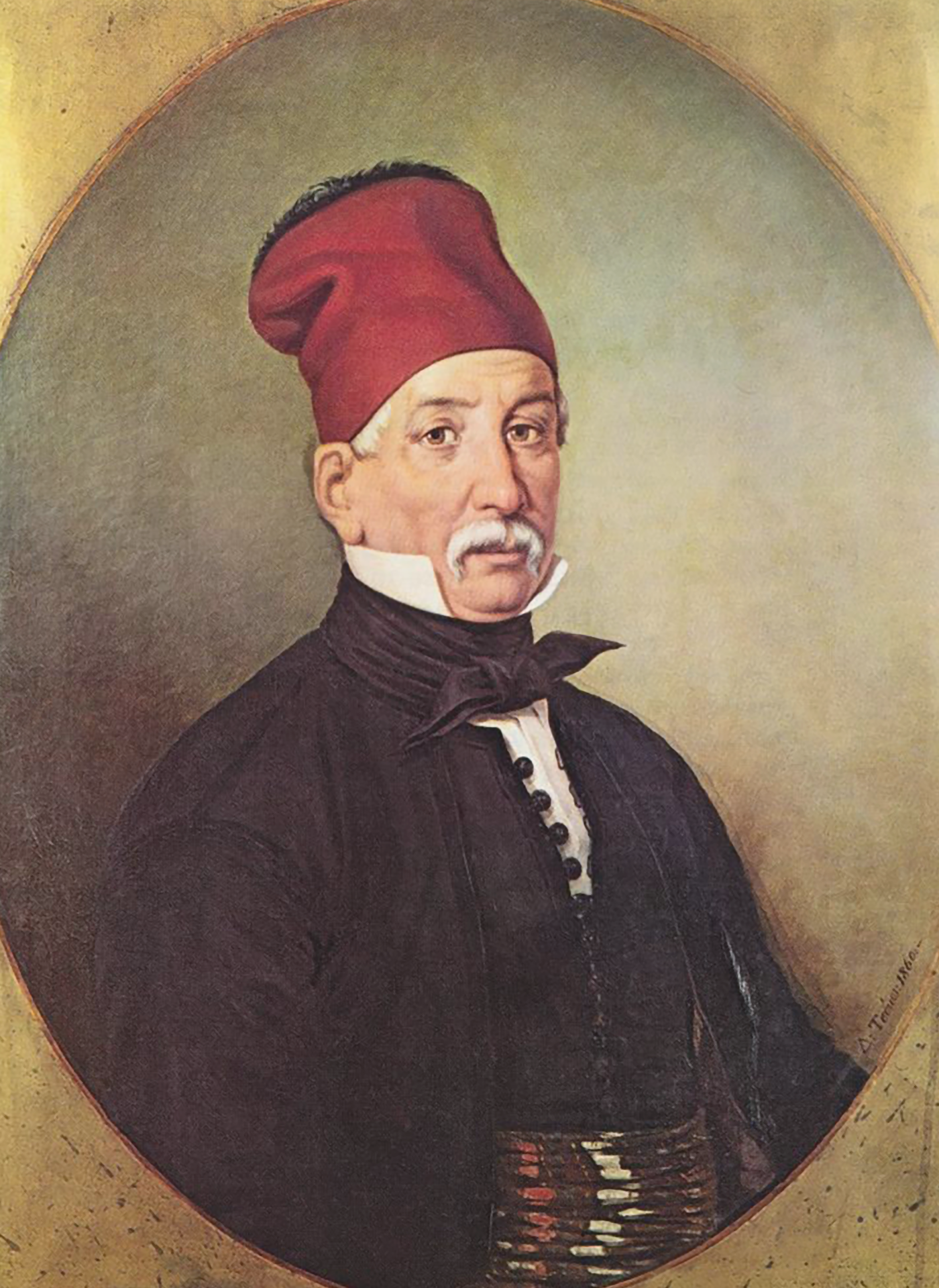
Georgios Kountouriotis

- Laskarina Bouboulina (1771–1825) merchant, shipowner, admiral
- Brenda Chamberlain (artist) (1912–1971) Welsh artist and writer
- Charmian Clift (1923–1969), Australian novelist and writer
- Leonard Cohen (1934–2016), Canadian singer-songwriter, poet and novelist who spent his early song-writing career on Hydra with his girlfriend Marianne Ihlen.
- Andrea Dimitry (1775–1852) Greek-American war hero, fought in the War of 1812.
- Dorotheus (1888–1957), Archbishop of Athens and All Greece
- Photius Fisk (1809–1890) Greek-American abolitionist and U.S. Navy Chaplain
- Axel Jensen (1932–2003) Norwegian author
- George Johnston (1912–1970), Australian journalist, novelist and writer
- Georgios Kountouriotis (1789–1858) merchant, shipowner, politician, Prime Minister of Greece
- Lazaros Kountouriotis (1769–1852) merchant, shipowner. The biggest funder of the Greek War of Independence.
- Pavlos Kountouriotis (1855–1935) admiral and President of Greece
- Panayotis Koupitoris (1821–1881), writer

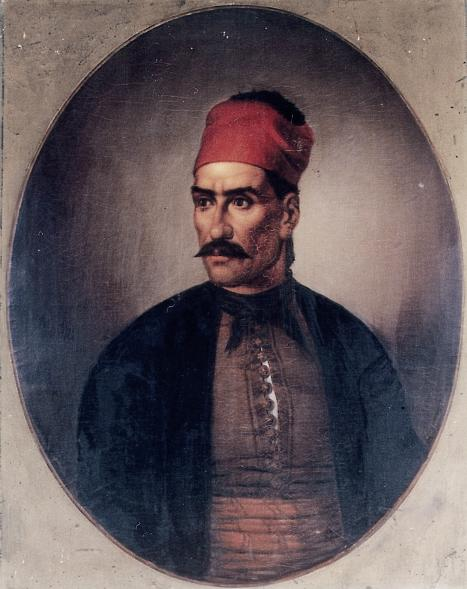
Anastasios Tsamados

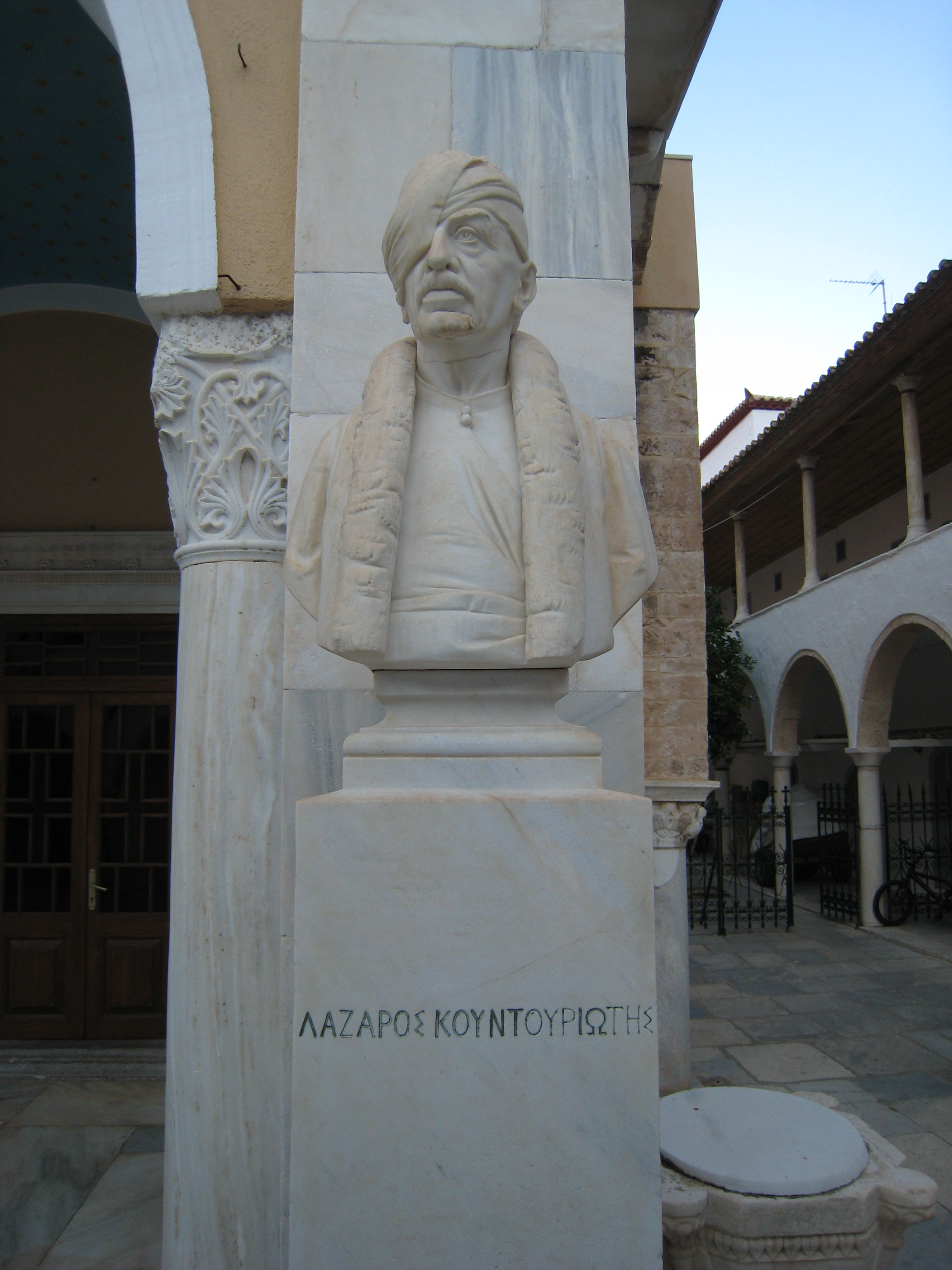
Bust of Lazaros Kountouriotis

- Antonios Kriezis (1796–1865) merchant, shipowner, admiral, Prime Minister of Greece
- Marios Loizides (1928–1988) was a Greek visual artist.
- Andreas Miaoulis (1768–1835), merchant, shipowner, admiral
- Athanasios Miaoulis (1815–1867) Prime Minister of Greece
- Nikos Nikolaou (1909–1986), artist
- Georgios Sachtouris, shipowner, admiral during the Greek war of Independence
- Panayiotis Tetsis (1925–2016), painter
- Emmanouil Tombazis, merchant, shipowner, admiral
- Iakovos Tombazis (1782–1829) merchant, shipowner, admiral

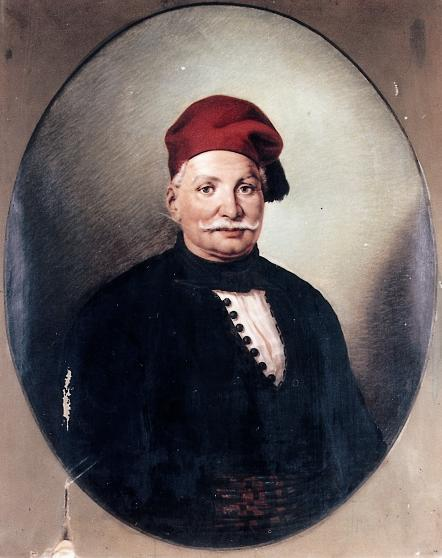
Georgios Sachtouris

- Rallou Manou, choreographer
- Anastasios Tsamados (1774–1825), shipowner, admiral, Greek captain of the brig Aris, died heroically in the Battle of Sphacteria (1825), holding off the Egyptian-Turkish landing force.
- Göran Tunström (1937–2000) Swedish author
- Lily Venizelos (b. 1933), conservationist
- Nikolaos Vokos (1854–1902), painter
- Elena Votsi (b. 1964), jewellery designer
- Nikolaos Votsis (1877–1931), admiral
- Dimitrios Voulgaris (1802–1878), merchant, shipowner, Prime Minister of Greece
- Gordon Merrick (1916–1988), author
- Kristina Colloredo-Mansfeld (b. 1940), artist
- Ingeborg Beugel (b. 1960), journalist
- Stephan Colloredo – Mansfeld (b. 1976), producer and writer
- Dimitrios Antonitsis (b. 1966), artist and curator

== Books about or set on Hydra ==
- The Colossus of Maroussi, Henry Miller (1941)
- Peel Me a Lotus, Charmian Clift (1959)
- The Sea Change, Elizabeth Jane Howard (1959)
- Doctors Wear Scarlet, Simon Raven (1960)
- A Rope of Vines: Journal from a Greek Island, Brenda Chamberlain (1965) (ISBN 9781905762866)
- The Sleepwalker, Margarita Karapanou (1985)
- Clouds over Hydra, Charles Young (1996)
- Fugitive Pieces, Anne Michaels (1996)
- The Riders, Tim Winton (1996)
- Hydra and the Bananas of Leonard Cohen, Roger Green (2003)
- Rhubarbs from a Rock, David Fagan (2003)
- Hydra, Catherine Vanderpool (1980)
- Le Premier jour, Marc Levy (2009)
- Travels with Epicurus, Daniel Klein (2012)
- Hydra vues privées / Private views, Catherine Panchout, Éditions Gourcuff Gradenigo (2015)
- Island of Cats – Hydra, Gabriela Staebler, Edition Reuss (2015)
- Beautiful Animals, Lawrence Osborne (2017)
- So Long, Marianne: a Love Story, Kari Hesthamar (2017)
- Hydra. An Island and Its Architecture, Michael Loudon (2018)
- Forth into Light, Gordon Merrick (1974)
- A Theatre for Dreamers, Polly Samson (2020)
- Half the Perfect World (writers, dreamers and drifters), Paul Genoni and Tanya Dalziell (2018)
- When We Were Almost Young: Hydra through War and Bohemians, Helle Goldman (editor, compiler) (2018)
- Δε λες κουβέντα ("Athens Undocumented"), Makis Malafekas (2018)
- The Warp of Time, Ekaterina Juskowski (2024)
- Hydra: Island in the Sound, Alkistis Boutsioukou and Ekaterina Juskowski (2025)
- Thirty Shocks For Thirty Maria's, Max Zaharopoulos (2026)

== Films shot on Hydra ==
- A Girl in Black (Greece, 1956)
- Boy on a Dolphin (1957)
- Phaedra (1962)
- Island of Love (1963)
- Incense for the Damned (1970)
- The Blue Villa (Un Bruit Qui Rend Fou) (1995)
- Boat Trip (2002)
- Fugitive Pieces (2007)
- The Capsule (2012)
- Marianne & Leonard: Words of Love (2019)
- The Trip to Greece (2020)

== In popular culture ==
- King Gizzard and the Lizard Wizard shot their video for Ice V on the island.

== Gallery ==
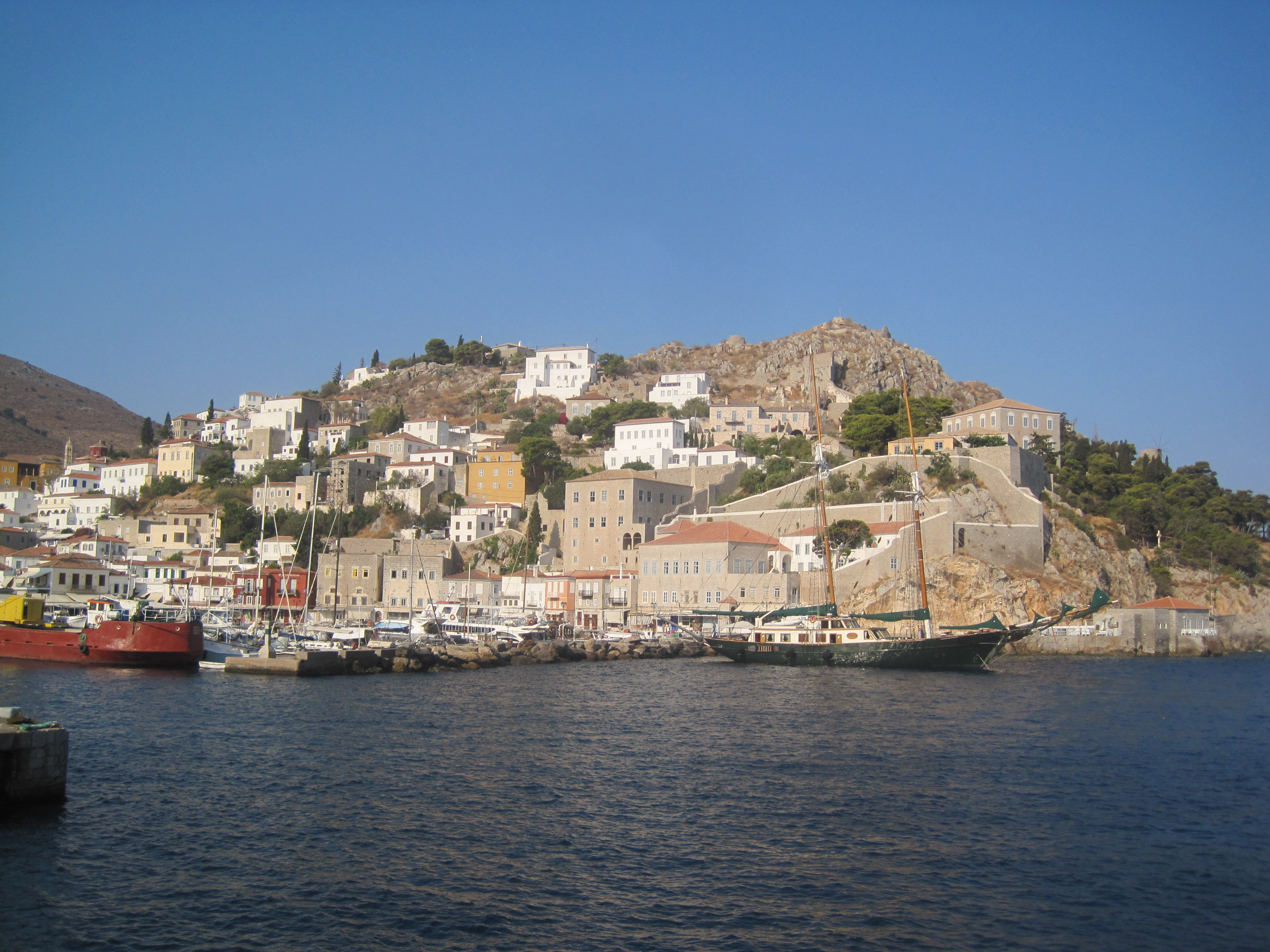
View of Hydra

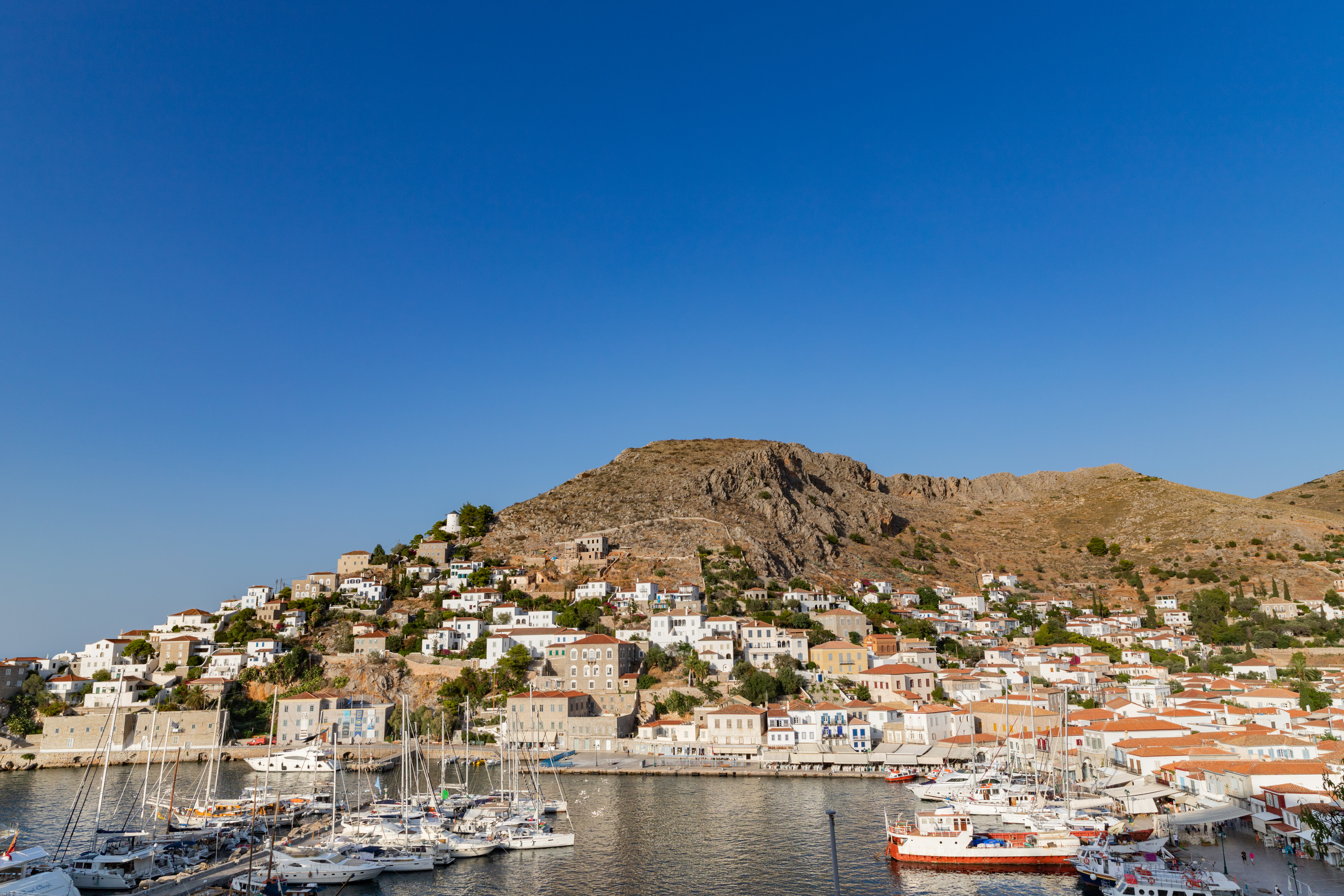
Hydra town and harbor

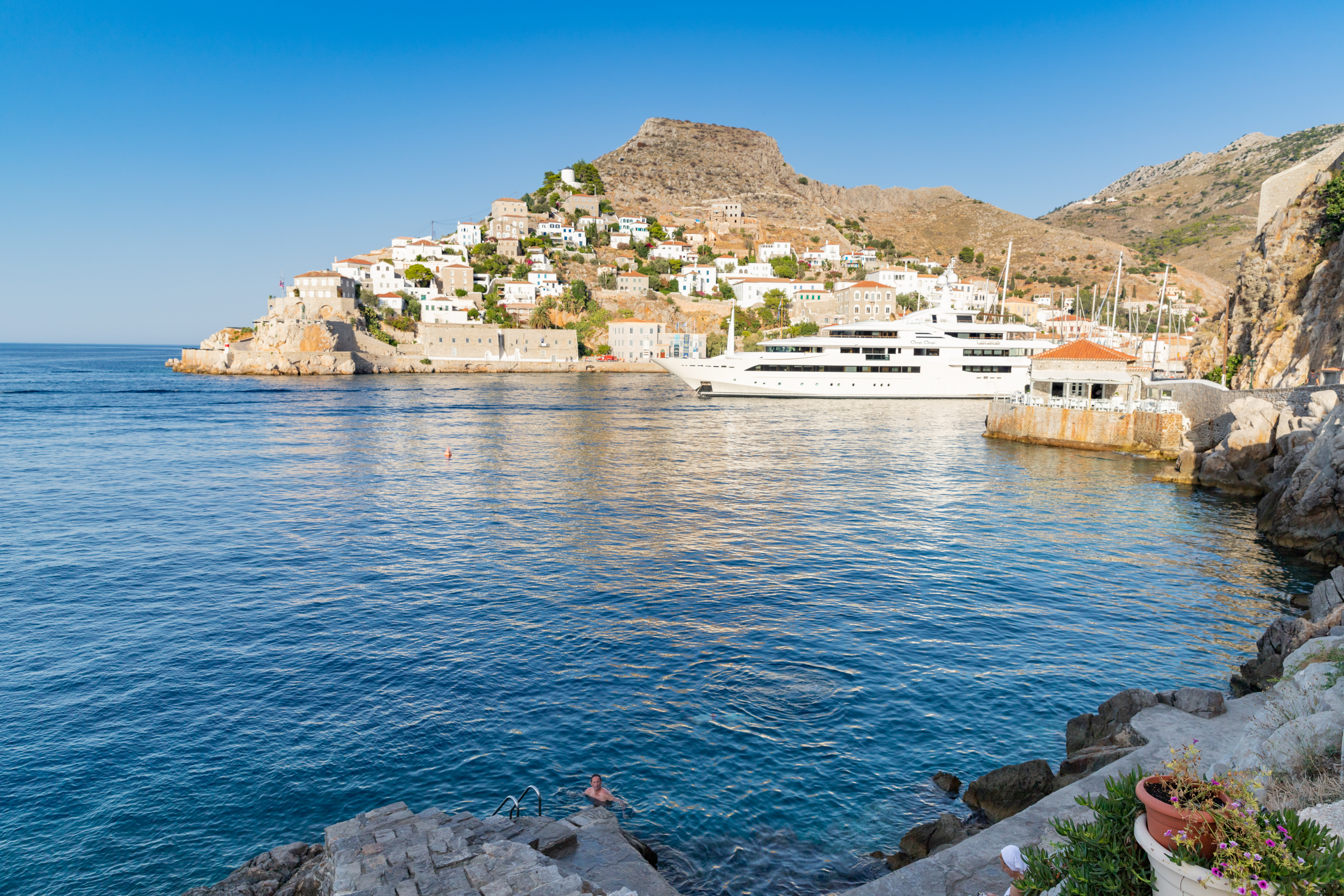
Hydra view from the west

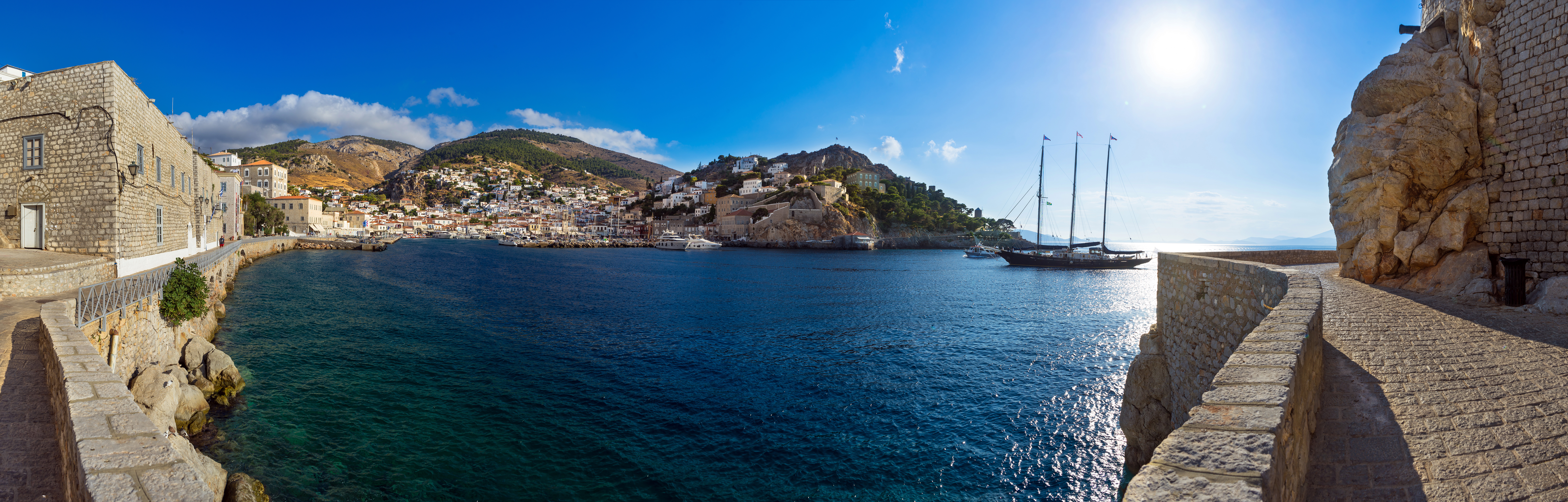
Panoramic view

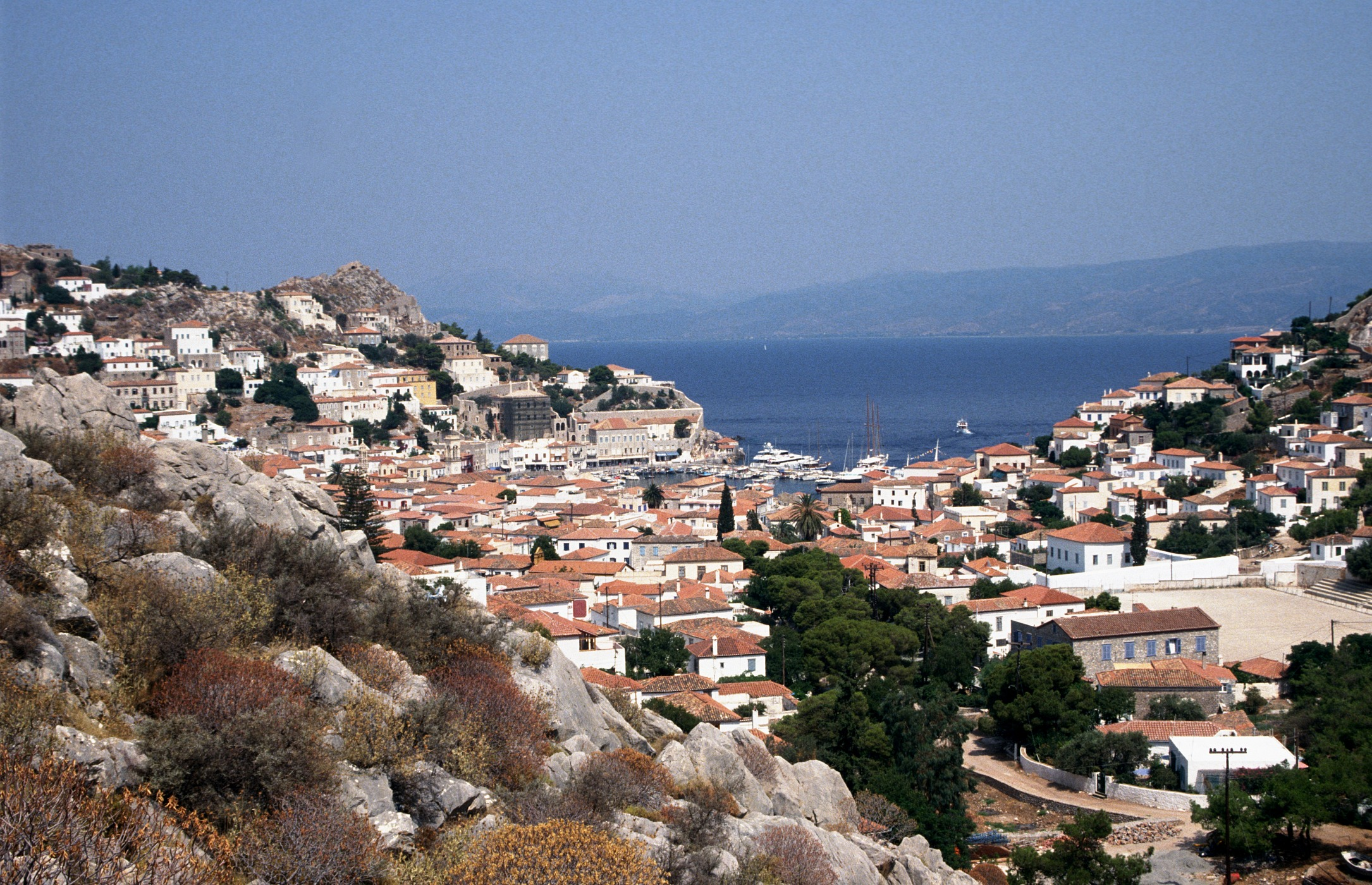
The town of Hydra on Hydra island, Greece

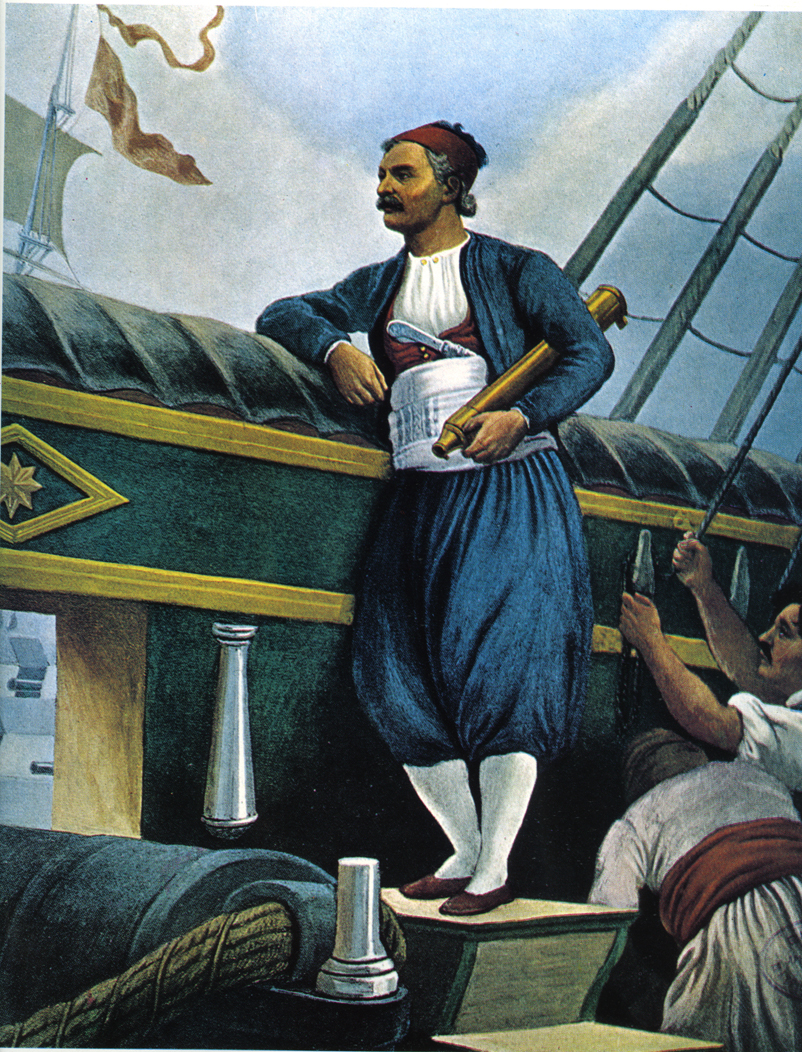
Andreas Vokos Miaoulis by Peter von Hess

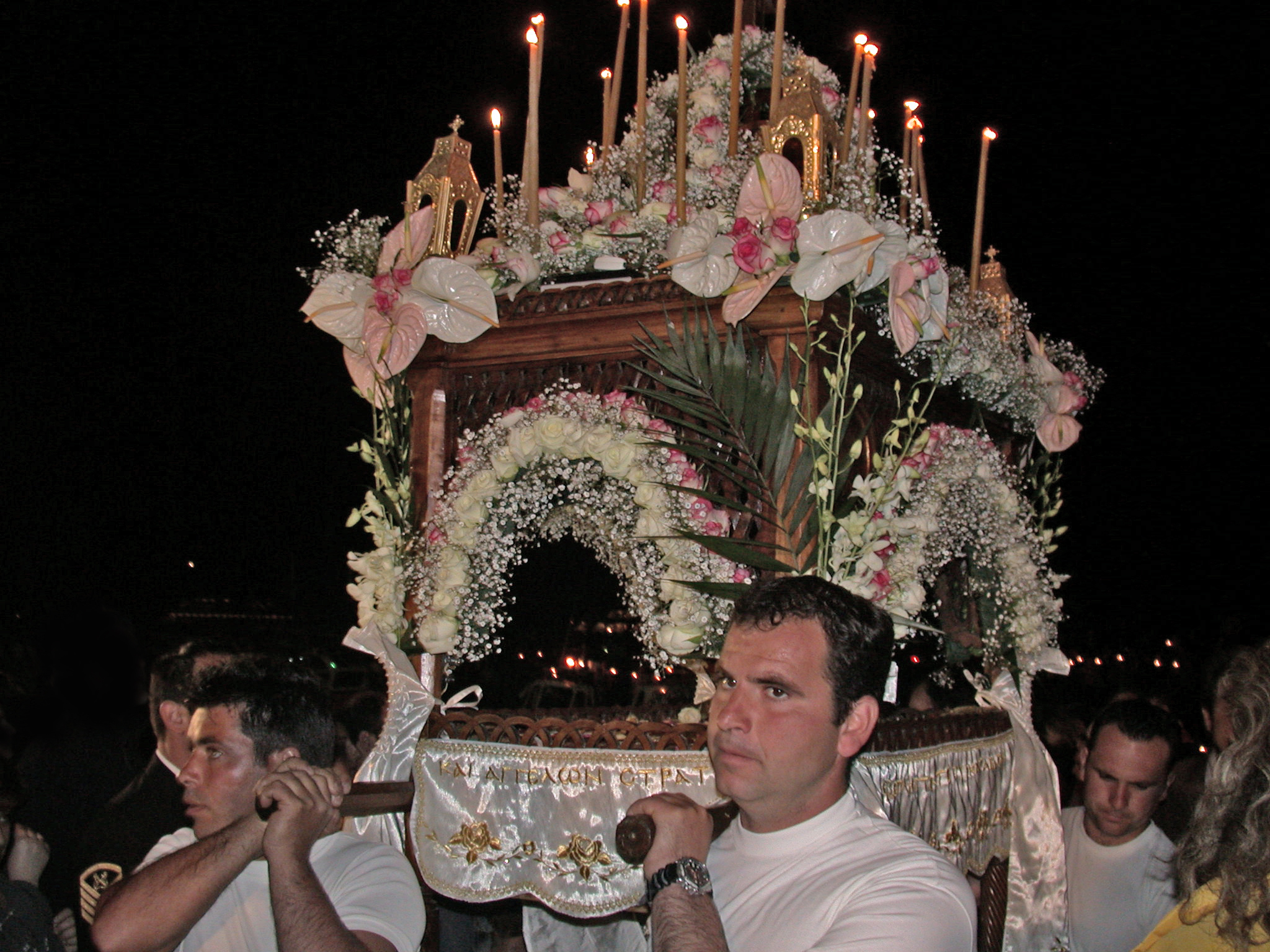
The Epitaphios being carried, Good Friday

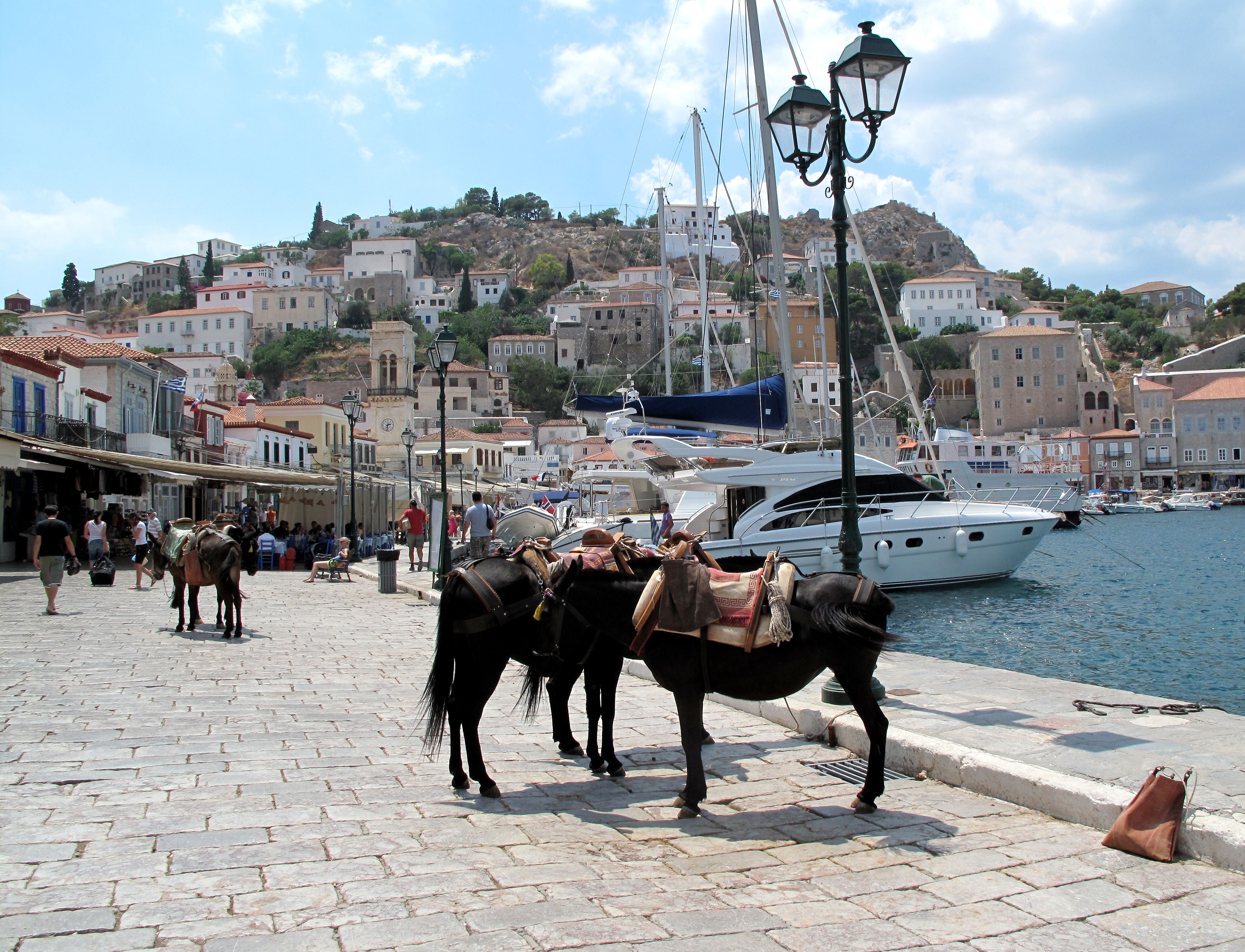
Snapshot from the seafront

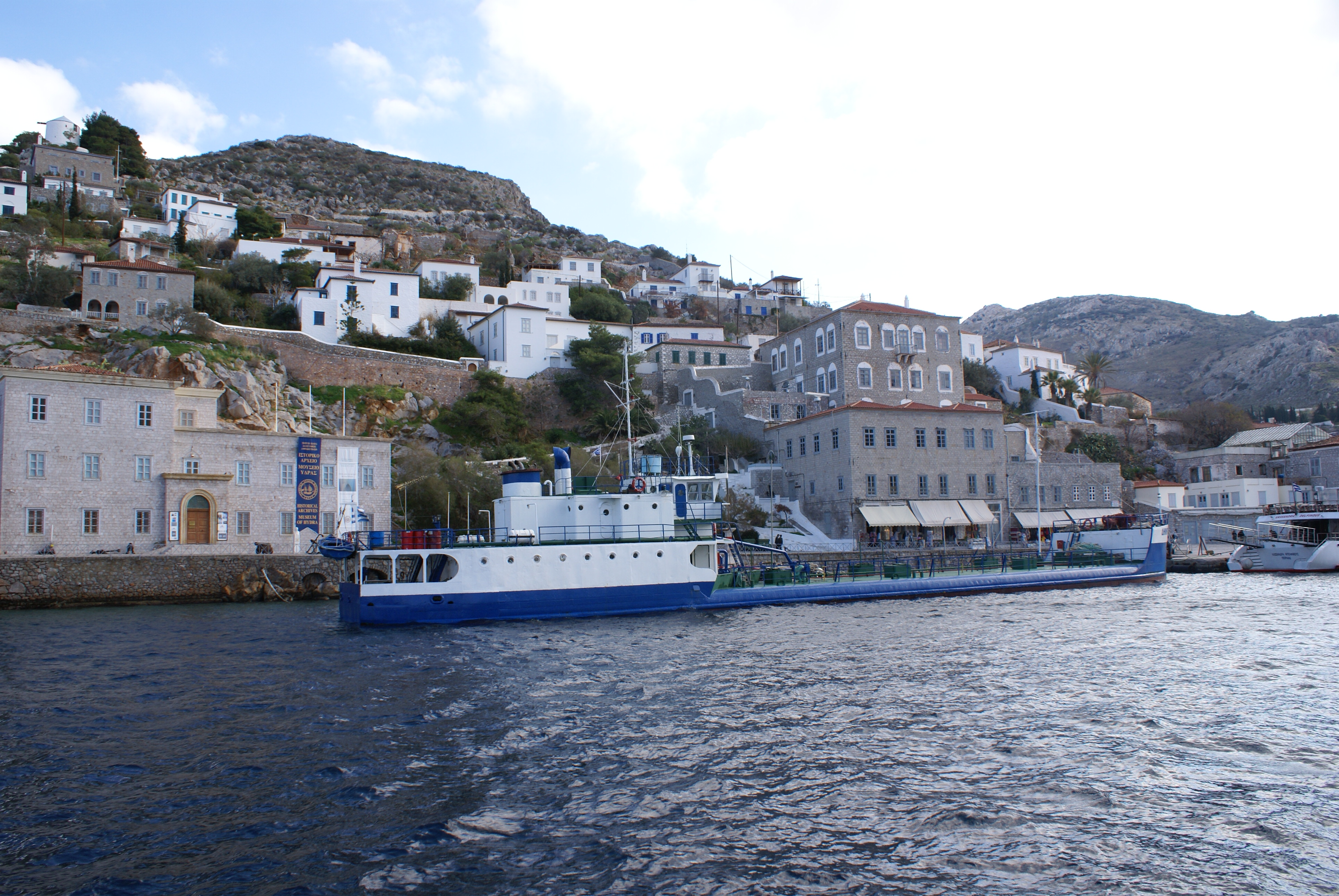
On the left the Museum of Hydra. On the right the Tsamados mansion.

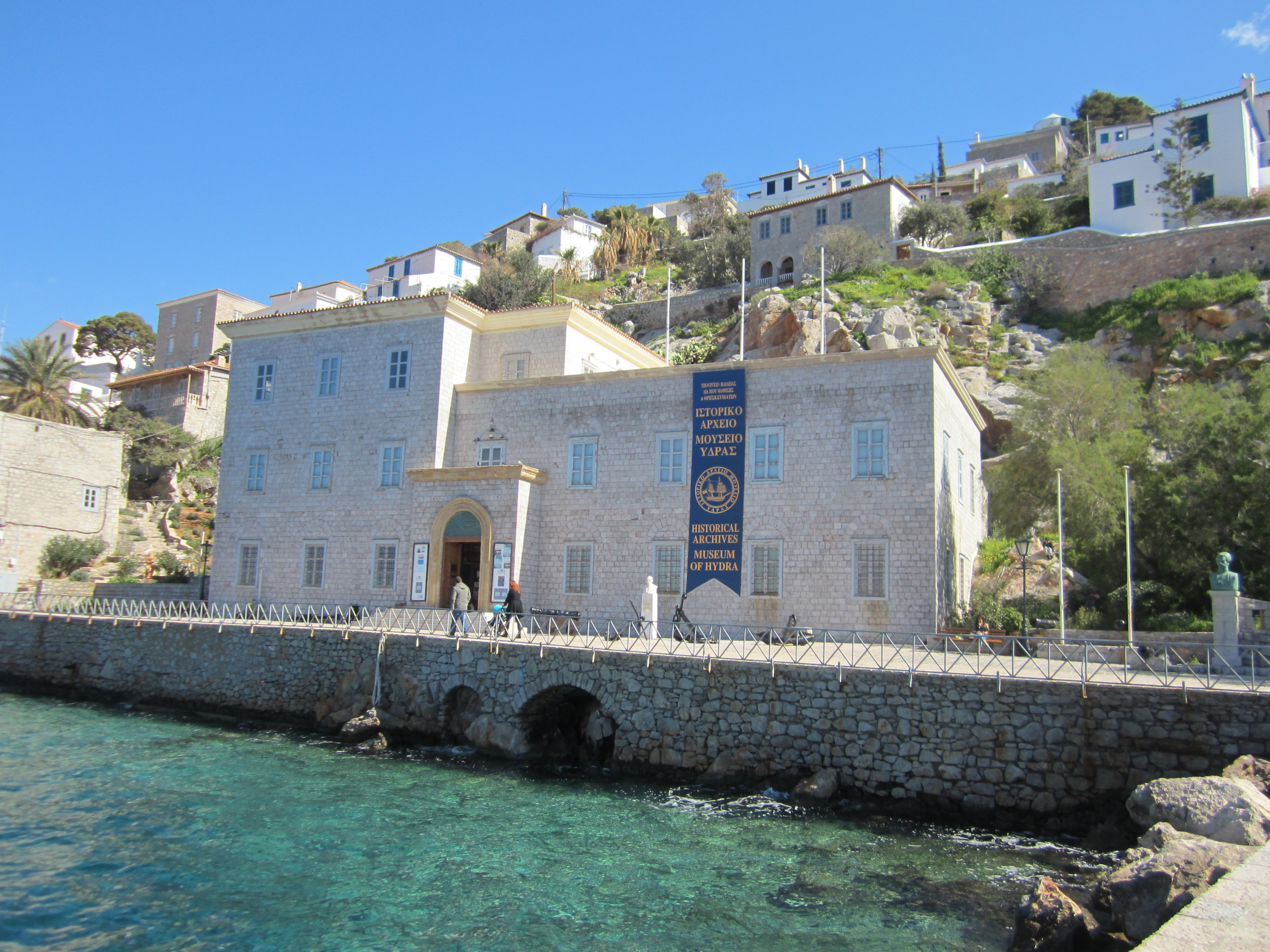
The Museum of Hydra.

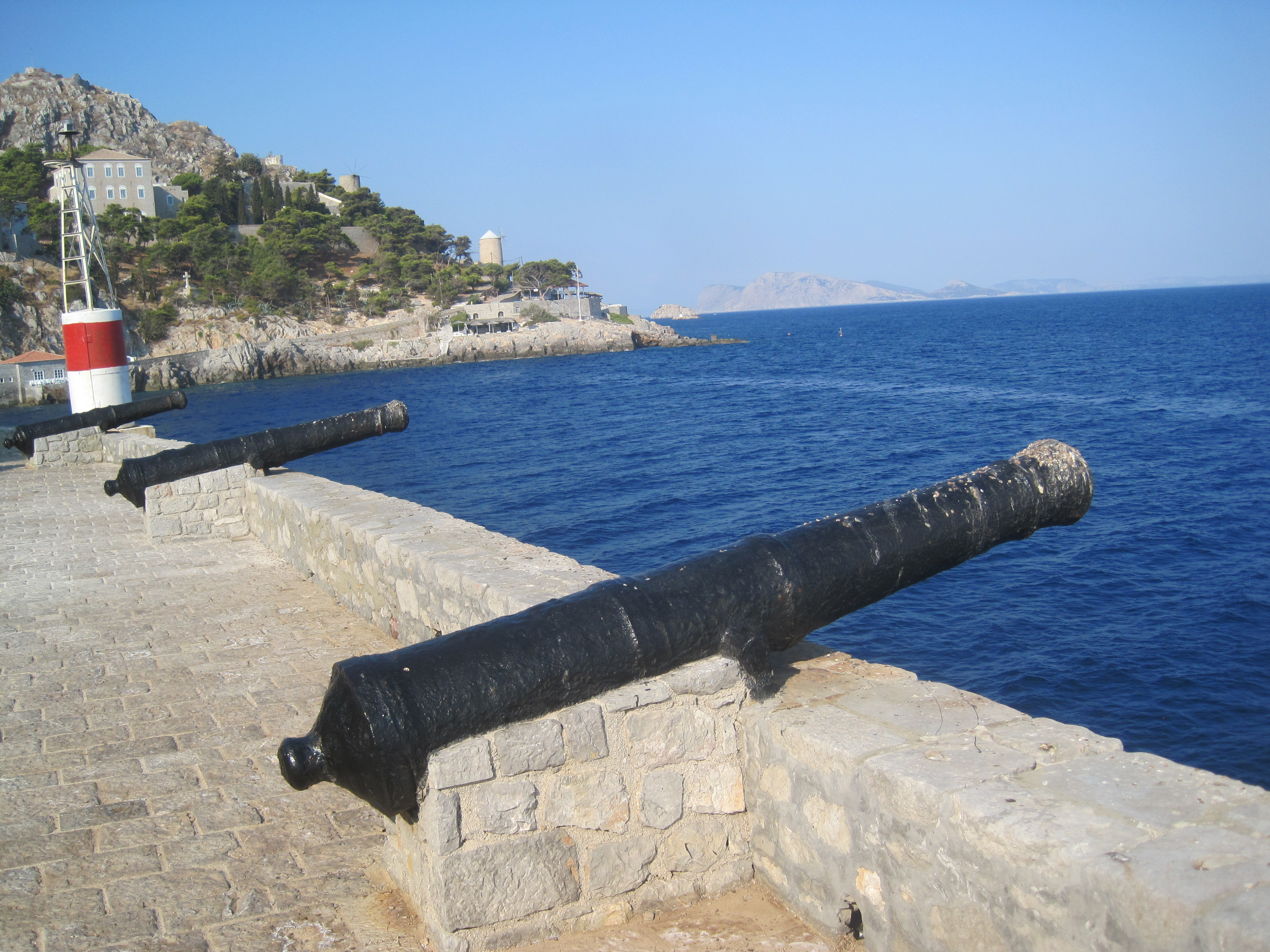
Cannons

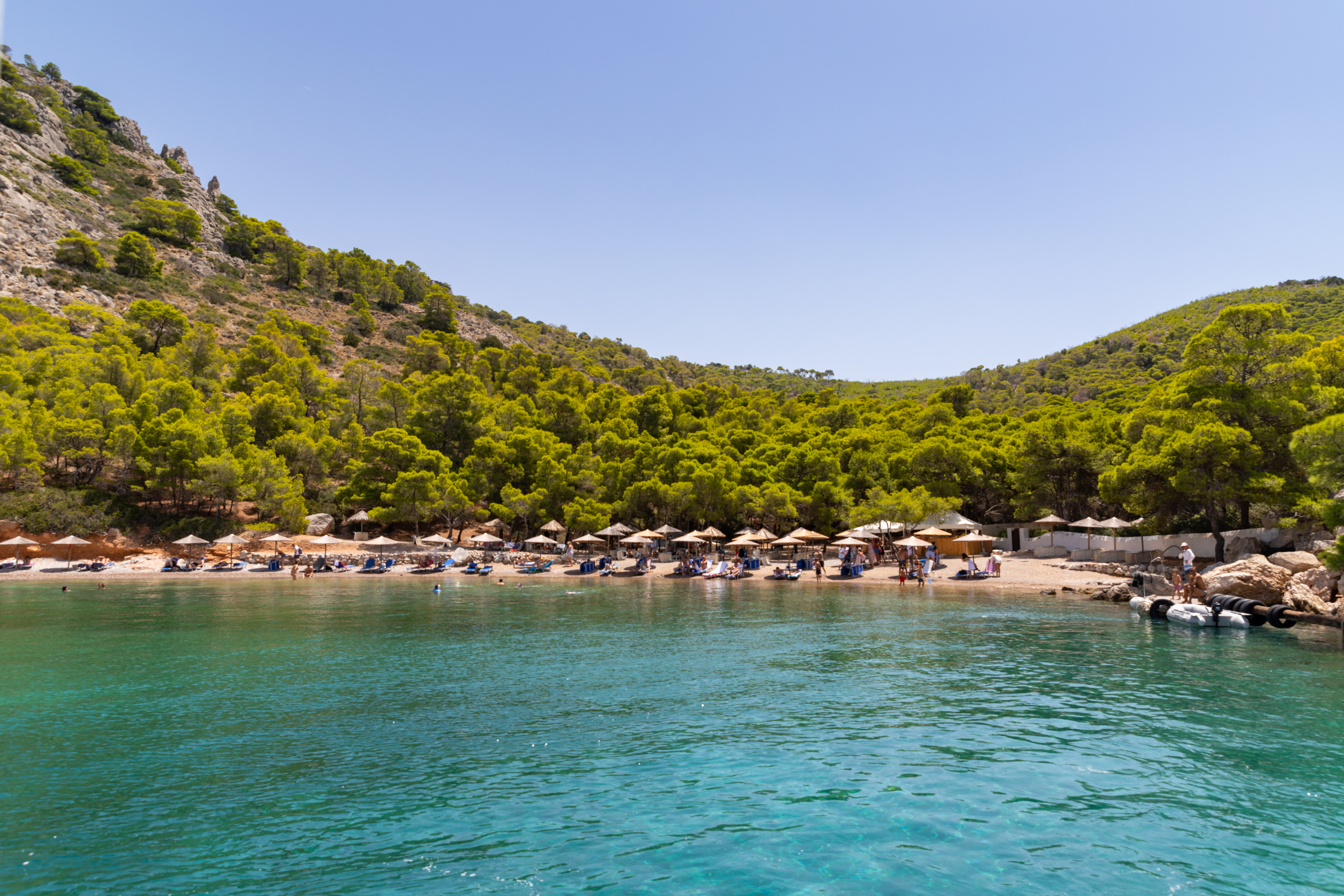
Bisti Beach Hydra island, Greece

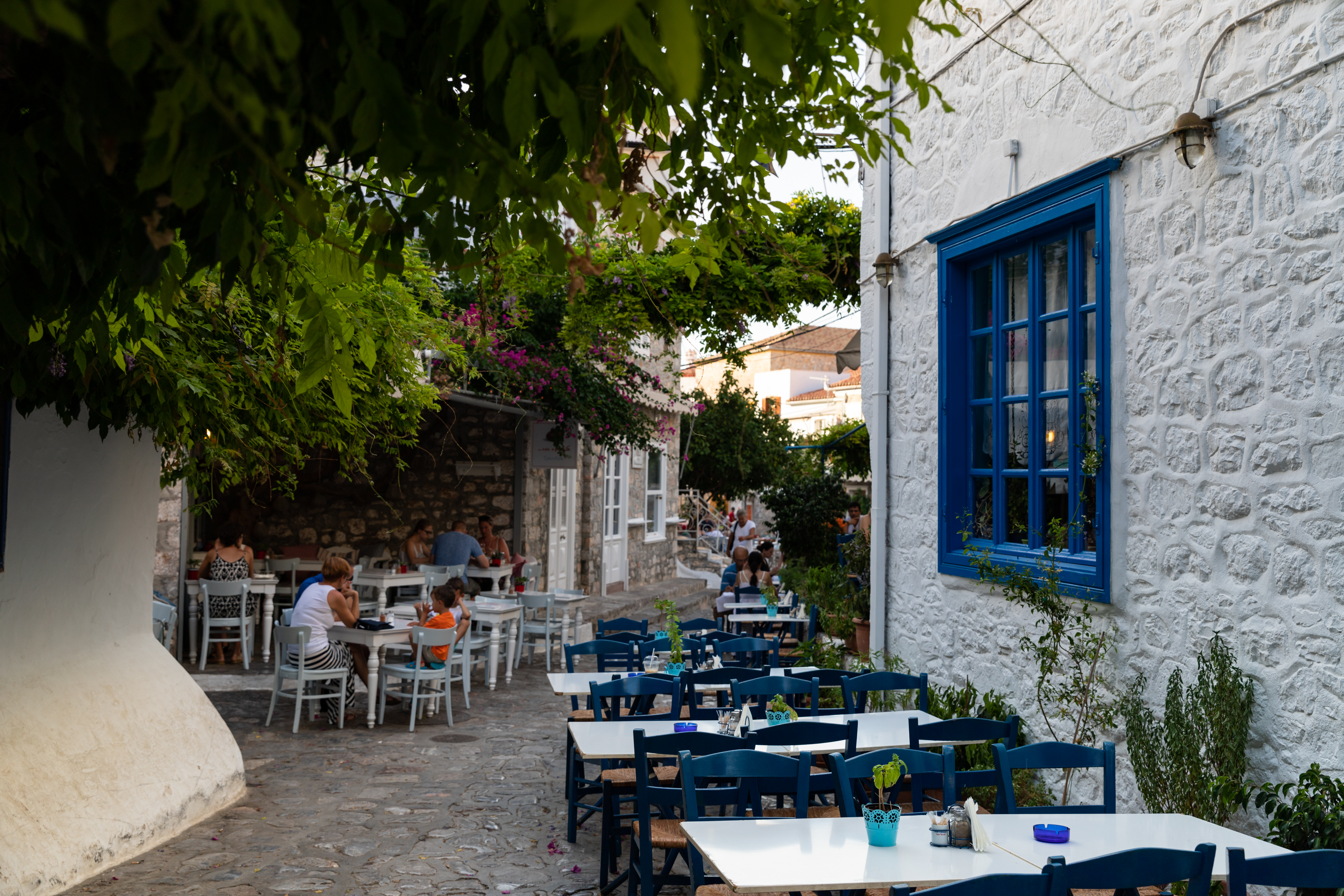
Hydra town

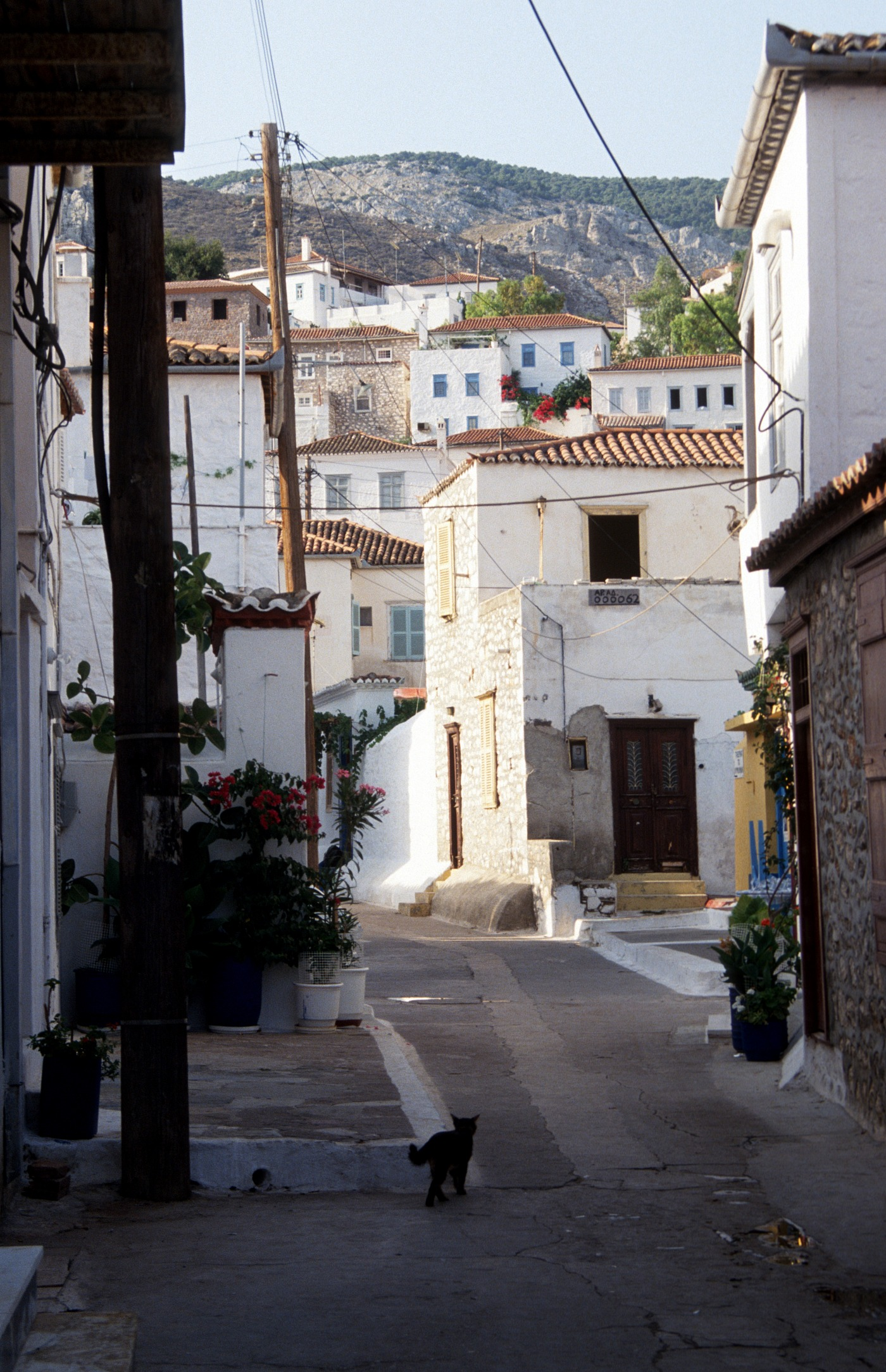
Street

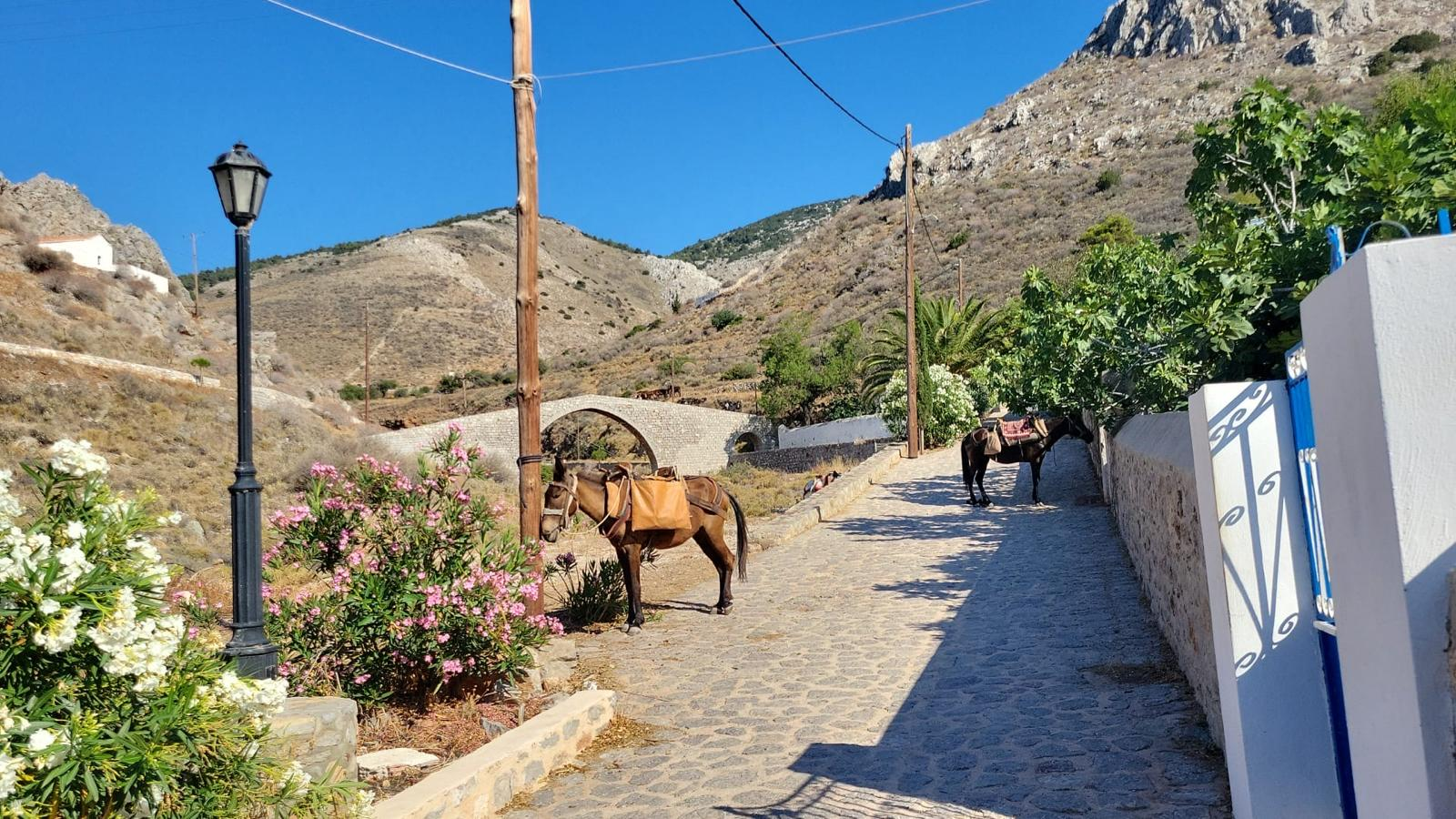
Mules of Hydra

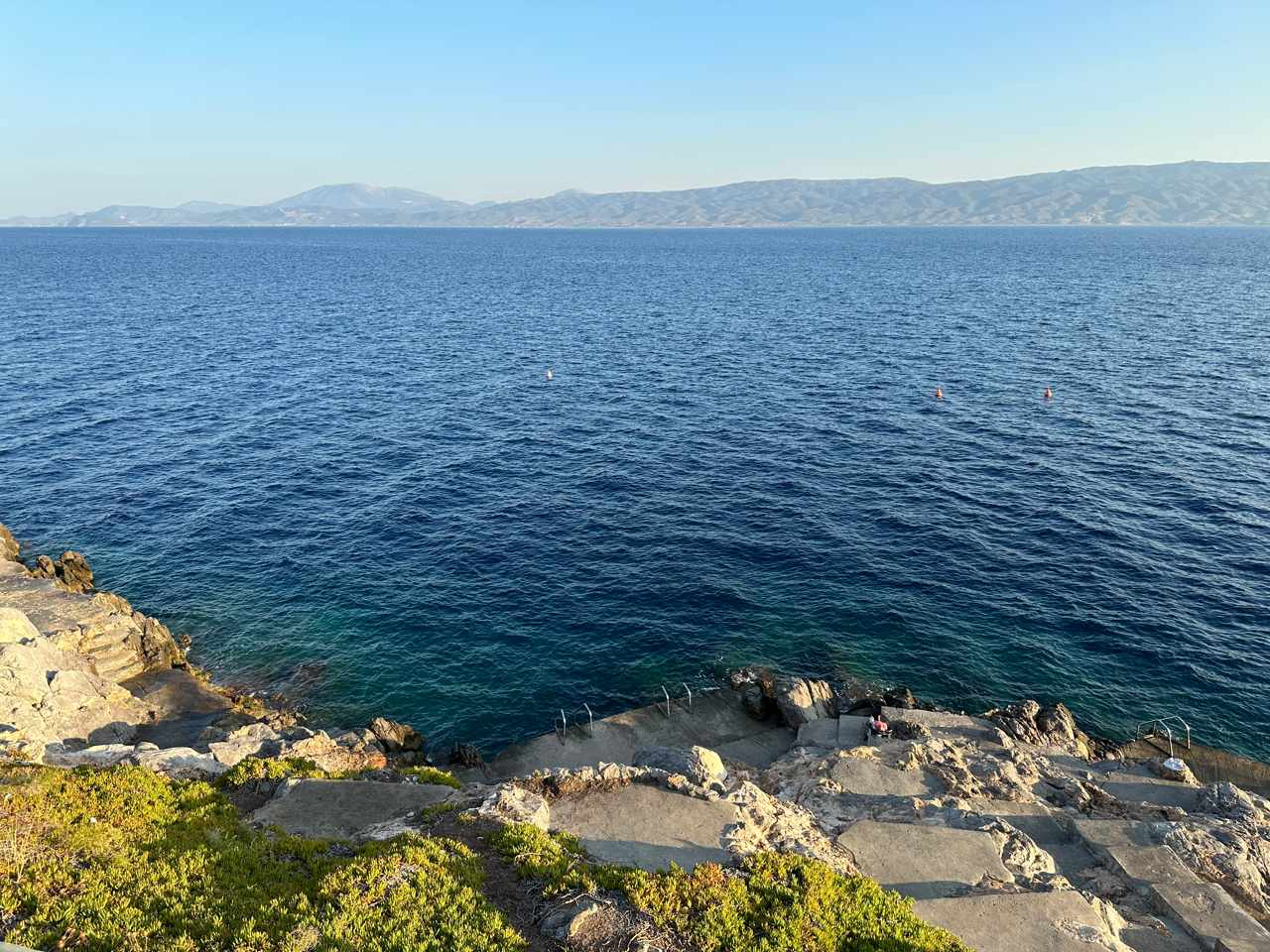
Hydra Island shores
