= Stephan Colloredo-Mansfeld =

Greek writer (born 1976)

Stephan Colloredo - Mansfeld
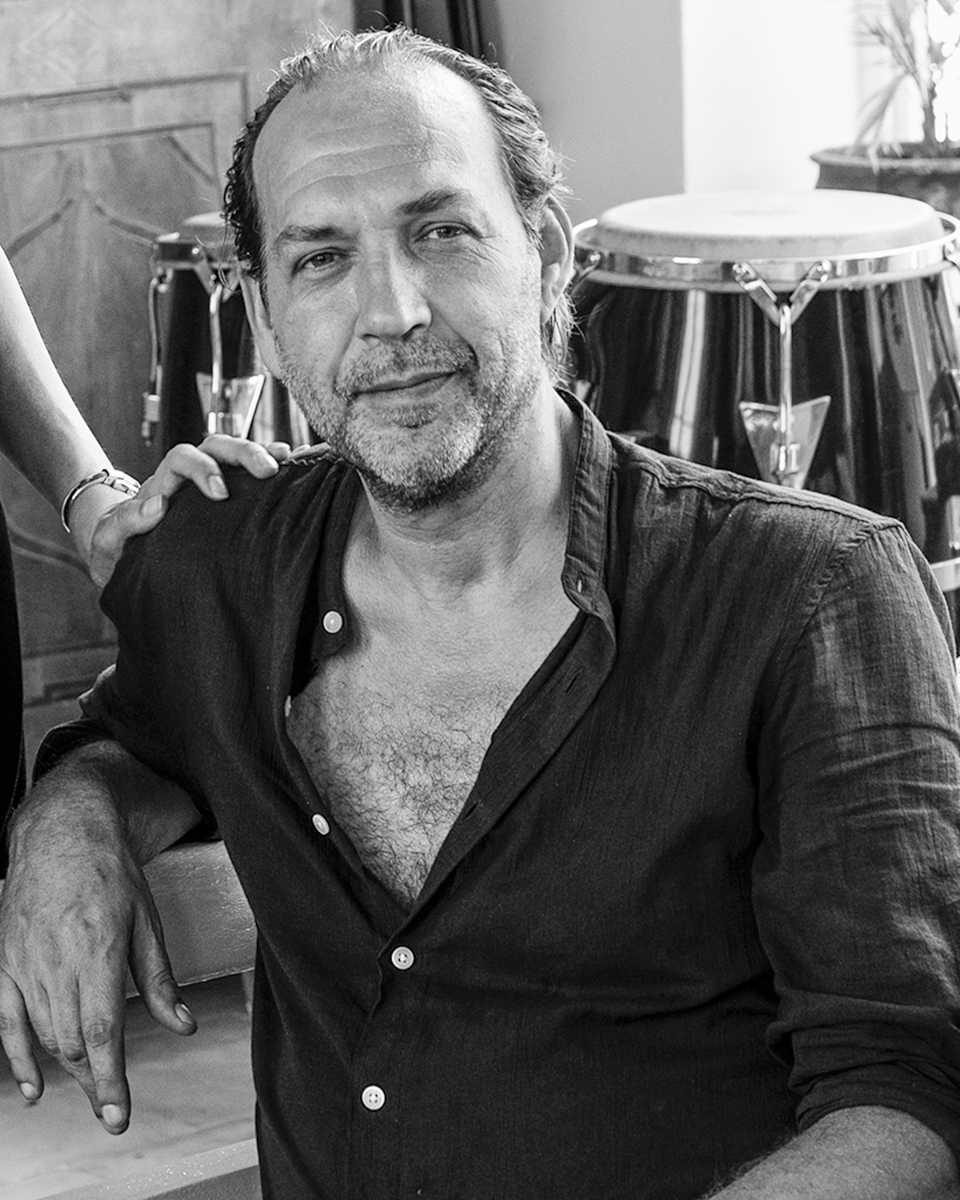
- Born: Athens, Greece
- Occupation: Music producer
- Known for: Old Carpet Factory
- Mother: Kristina Colloredo - Mansfeld

Stephan Colloredo-Mansfeld is a writer, music producer and expert of psychedelic music on vinyl.

== Early life ==
He was born in Athens in 1976. His parents are artist Kristina Colloredo-Mansfeld and writer Michael Begert. In 1978 his parents bought a historical mansion on the Greek island Hydra, known locally as the Old Carpet Factory since 1924. He grew up on the island. On his mother's side he belongs to the Colloredo - Mansfeld family. His paternal grandfather was a Swiss educational reformer Fritz Jean Begert (1907-1984), nonconformist and the founder of the «Kerzenkreises» (Candle Circle)

== Old Carpet Factory ==
In 2016 he added a residential recording studio called the Old Carpet Factory to his Hydra home. Many international artists stay at the house and record at the studio, among them are Sébastien Tellier, Oracle Sisters, Chet Faker, Cate Le Bon, and others.

In 2019, curator and photographer Ekaterina Juskowski established the Hydra Art Residency at the Old Carpet Factory, with the mission to document and preserve the island’s rich cultural heritage while fostering contemporary artistic production. Through this initiative, the Old Carpet Factory supports innovative projects that contribute to the local community and enhance public access to Hydra’s unique cultural landscape. The residency also commissions site-specific works that expand the estate’s permanent art collection.

== Psychedelic music ==
Stephan Colloredo - Mansfeld started collecting vinyl records at the age of 11 and amassed a collection consisted of over 10,000 LPs, most of which were psychedelic rock including the largest collection of Tiger Lily releases in the world.

== In popular culture ==
Greek writer Makis Malafekas based his pulp-noir novel "De les kouventa / Δε λες κουβέντα" (Athens Undocumented) on the events that took place at the Old Carpet Factory mansion with one of the main characters drawn from Stephan Colloredo-Mansfeld. "The Warp of Time" book written by Ekaterina Juskowski and published by Mnemosyne Projects in 2024 tells the history of the Old Carpet Factory mansion and its owners from Anastasios Tsamados to Stephan Colloredo-Mansfeld. The book "Dream Businesses" about some of the most inspiring business owners changing the face of entrepreneurship worldwide features an interview with Stephan Colloredo-Mansfeld.
