= Dimitrios Antonitsis =

Greek visual artist

- Born: 1966 (age 59–60); Athens, Greece
- Occupation: Art curator
- Notable work: Hydra School Projects

Dimitrios Antonitsis (born 1966) is a Greek art curator, critic, and artist. He is the founder of Hydra School Projects.

== Life and work ==
Born in Athens, in 1966, Antonitsis studied mechanical engineering at the Zurich ETH and the Rensselaer Polytechnic Institute in Troy, New York (Master of Science), where he specialised in the high-speed microscopic photography of vortex rings. He won an award for his short film Past Glories, Present Despondencies, a collaboration with Robert De Niro's production company. His work has appeared in 15 solo and 55 group exhibitions in Greece and abroad.

He is the founder and curator of Hydra School Projects, an international platform for the visual arts and the HSP Residency Program. Held annually since 2000, the Hydra School Projects, named because these contemporary art exhibitions are shown at the old Hydra High School, showcase the work of up-and-coming, young Greek as well as international artists alongside those already well established.

Antonitsis works has garnered international recognition with his works acquired by public and private collections. Among these are the National Museum of Contemporary Art and the DESTE Foundation in Athens, MoMus in Thessaloniki, Museo per la Fotografia in Turin, the Museum of Contemporary Art in Pittsburgh, and the Benedict Taschen Collection in Cologne. His practice also resonates within notable private holdings, including the Nicoletta Fiorucci Collection in Italy and the John Waters and Brice Marden Collections in New York. A significant exhibition history includes a presentation at the Chelsea Art Museum in New York, an institution that, while now closed, once played a pivotal role in showcasing contemporary voices.

== Hydra School Projects ==
Hydra School Projects is an annual summer pop-up exhibition founded in 2000 and curated by Dimitrios Antonitsis on Hydra island. Since its inception, the exhibition presented new and upcoming young artists alongside prominent international and Greek artists such as Gregor Hildebrandt, Brice Marden, Kiki Smith, Leonora Carrington, Tschabalala Self, and others. The exhibition is housed in local public schools or other spaces such as hotels, town squares, and the Merchant Marine Academy.

2025 - Lithos/Lethe (Stone/Oblivion) . Featured artists: Dimitrios Antonitsis, Isabella Ducrot, William Farrell, Jannis Kounellis, Brice Marden, Konrad Żukowski, Felicia Reed, Billy Sullivan, and Angela Tisner.

2024 - 8 Femmes. Featured artists: Avantika, Leonora Carrington, Chiara Clemente, Mary Hatzinikoli, Mary Michalakakos, Valentina Palazzari, Priya Kishore, and Tschabalala Self.

== Curatorial work ==
2022 - "Brice Marden and Greek Antiquity." Museum of Cycladic Art, Athens, Greece.

== Exhibitions ==
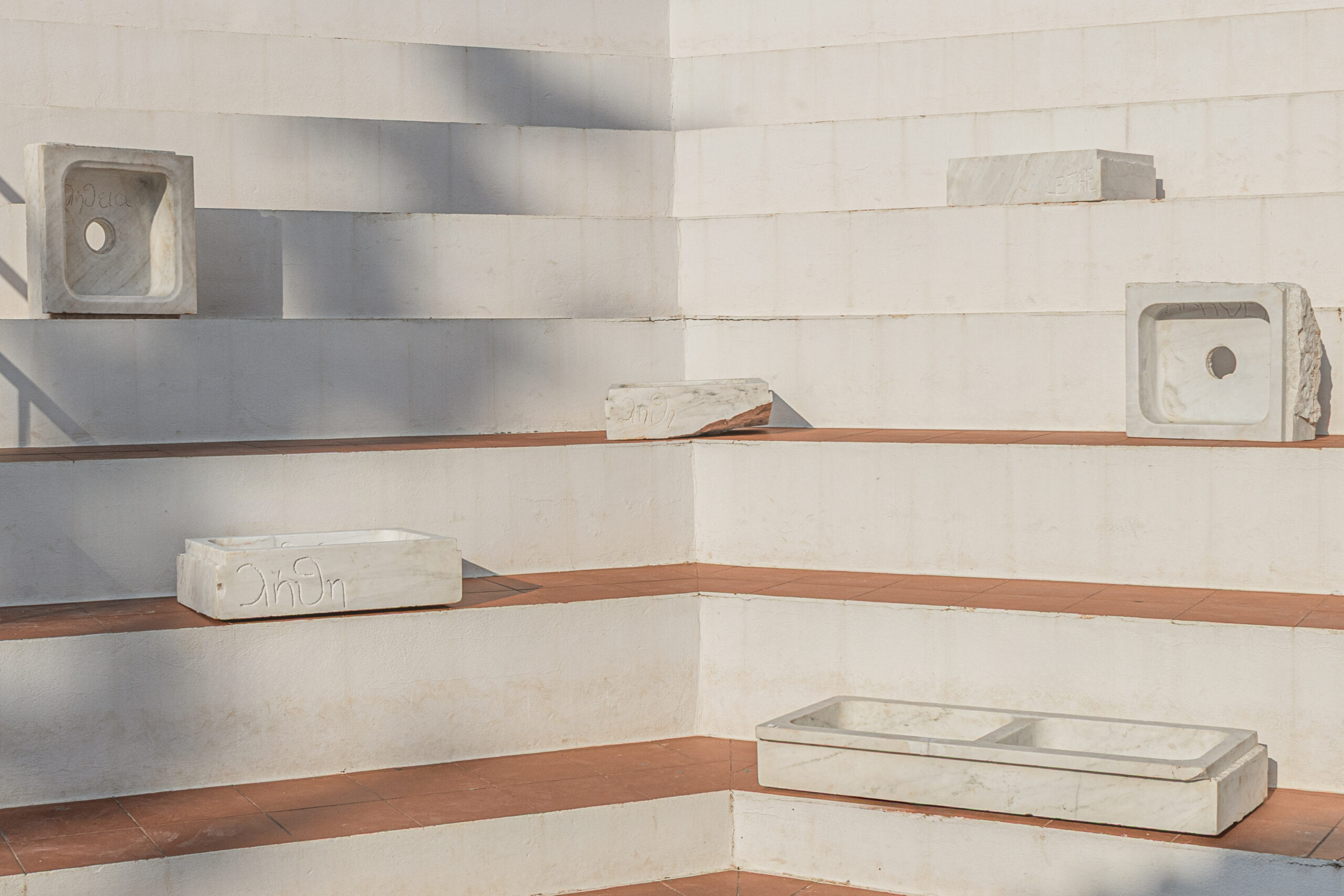
Fountains site-specific installation curated by Tatiana Gecmen-Waldek and Ekaterina Juskowski

2025 - "Fountains" - a site-specific installation curated by Ekaterina Juskowski and Tatiana Gecmen-Waldek for Mnemosyne Projects during Lithos/Lethe exhibition. Hydra Island, Greece.

2024 - "The Warp of Time." Old Carpet Factory, Hydra Island, Greece.

2024 - "Phimôsis." Ileana Tounta Gallery, Athens, Greece

== Publications ==
“Brice Marden and Greek Antiquity” Exhibition Catalog – Bilingual Edition.

"Brice Marden: Marbles and Drawings."
