= Tivoli, New York =

- Village
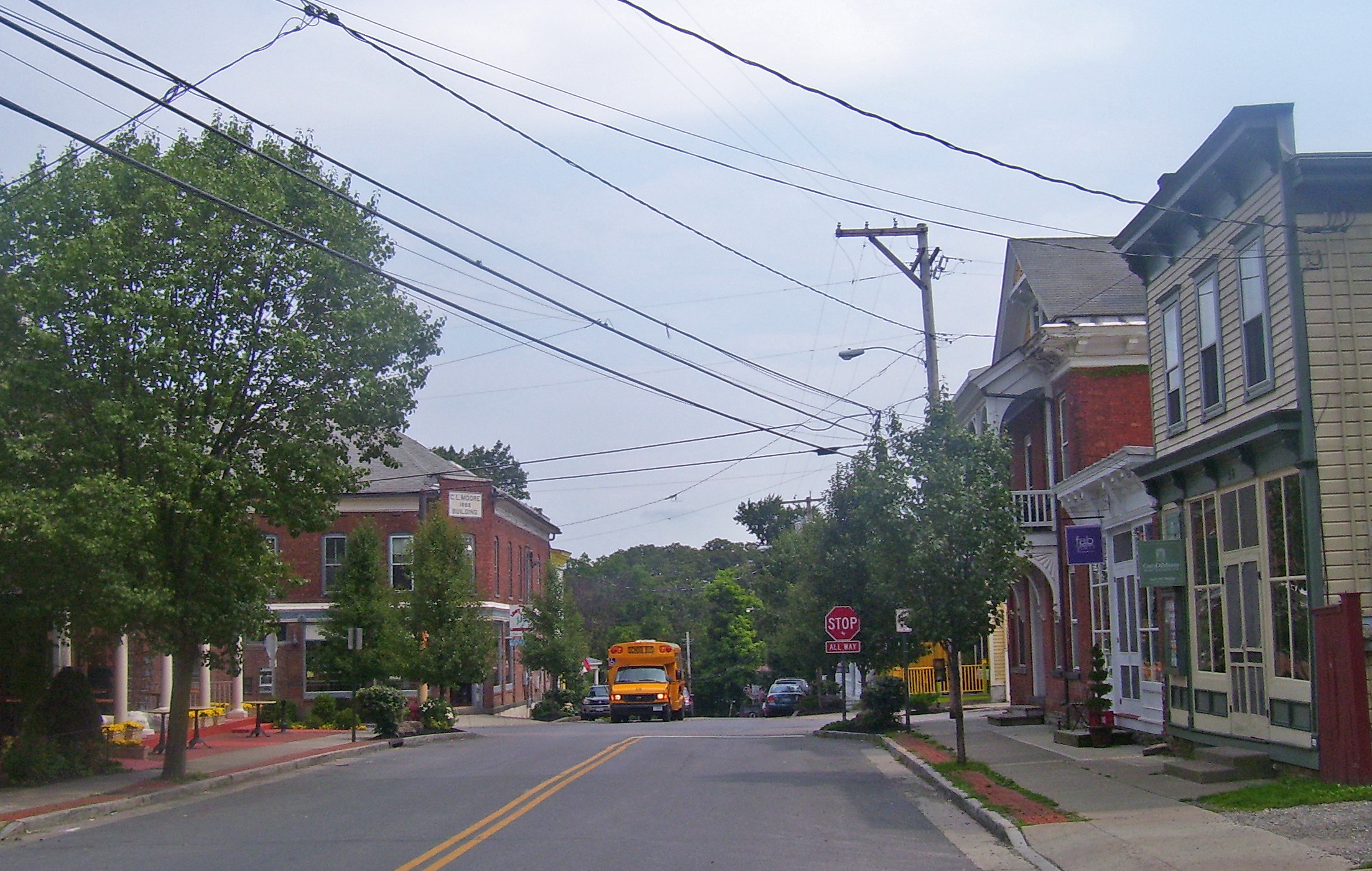
- Downtown Tivoli, looking east

- Seal
- Etymology: Jardin de Tivoli, Paris
- Motto: A Community That Cares
- Location of Tivoli, New York

- Location of New York in the United States
- Coordinates: 42°03′31″N 73°54′43″W
- Country: United States
- State: New York
- Region: Hudson Valley
- County: Dutchess
- Town: Red Hook
- Incorporated: 1872

Government
  - Type: village

Area
  - Total: 1.55 sq mi (4.01 km^{2})
  - Land: 1.54 sq mi (3.99 km^{2})
  - Water: 0.0039 sq mi (0.01 km^{2})
- Elevation: 148 ft (45 m)

Population (2020)
  - Total: 1,012
  - Density: 656.3/sq mi (253.38/km^{2})
- Time zone: UTC-5 (Eastern (EST))
  - Summer (DST): UTC-4 (EDT)
- ZIP Code: 12583
- Area code: 845
- FIPS code: 36-74023
- GNIS feature ID: 2391167
- Website: www.tivoliny.org

Tivoli is a village in Dutchess County, New York, United States. The population is 1,012, according to the 2020 census. The village, which was incorporated in 1872 from parts of Upper Red Hook Landing and Madalin, is the northernmost settlement in the county, located in the northwestern part of the town of Red Hook. It is part of the Kiryas Joel–Poughkeepsie–Newburgh metropolitan area as well as the larger New York metropolitan area. It is entirely within the Hudson River Historic District, a National Historic Landmark. The village is accessible via New York State Route 9G at an intersection with Dutchess County Route 78.

The Kaatsbaan Cultural Center is located within the village boundaries. It was once known as the Kaatsbaan International Dance Center.

== History ==
For thousands of years, indigenous peoples had lived in this area. The historic Mohican Native American tribe was living in the area now known as Tivoli at the time Dutch colonists arrived in the 1600s. The Mohican derive from Lenni Lenape people who moved North from the coastal areas and settled in today’s Hudson Valley. They lived along the Hudson River which they named Mahicannituck. They originally called themselves the Muh-he-con-neok (The People of the Waters That Are Never Still). Based on their location, they were often referred to as the River Indians. Their name evolved in spelling over the years, including the name “Mahikan”, until it became today’s Mohican.

A deed to land purchased by Robert Livingston from several Mahican Indians in July 1683, is the strongest evidence that the Roeliff Jansen Kill is considered to mark the downriver boundary of Mahican territory on the East side of the Hudson Valley. This land purchased would form the majority of the manor and lordship of Livingston. Historical accounts state that the settled land of Tivoli was purchased from Native American communities “legitimately” by Colonel David Schuyler on June 2, 1688, although no records of this transaction exist today. There is speculation as to whether or not the Mohican Tribe “fully understood European notions of land ownership." This transaction would have been a trade of goods in exchange for land. This deal was part of the Schuyler Patent, a June 1688 patent defining some of the towns and villages in Dutchess County and the Poughkeepsie regional area. The patent was obtained for land in the far North-West corner of Dutchess County, lying to the East of Magdalen Island (present-day Cruger Island). The North boundary of the patent abutted the Livingston Purchase of 1683.

The village was formerly known as "Upper Red Hook Landing". An adjacent community, "Madalin", was contiguous to Upper Red Hook Landing.

Peter Delabegarre – also known as Pierre de la Bigarre – purchased land along the Hudson River in the 1790s south of Chancellor Robert R. Livingston's estate Clermont, in order to build a village he called "Tivoli"; the name was taken from the location of the Roman resort. His planned settlement was never built as he conceived it before he went bankrupt, but the name of Tivoli remained attached to the area.

The village of Tivoli was incorporated in 1872, consolidating Madalin and Upper Red Hook Landing. The population at the time was 1,081.

=== Rose Hill ===
Rose Hill, located on Rose Hill Lane off Woods Road in Tivoli, New York, is an estate with a villa built in the Tuscan style in 1843 by John Watts de Peyster. The name Rose Hill comes from the summer home in Upper Manhattan of de Peyster's grandfather, Watts, which in turn was named after the grandfather's estate near Edinburgh. After his death, it became the Leake and Watts Orphan House. The estate was bought in 1964 by Dorothy Day of the Catholic Worker Movement, which operated it as a farm until 1978. As of 2017, it was the home of painters Brice and Helen Marden, owners of the Hotel Tivoli.

John Cranch's sister spent a much-enjoyed summer at Rose Hill.

== Geography ==
Tivoli is located in the northwest corner of Dutchess County. The Tivoli Landing, where Tivoli meets the Hudson River, offers natural advantages that have led members of the Dutchess County Historical Society to assert that there were sporadic American Indian encampments there. The two islands nearby provided a measure of safety.

According to the United States Census Bureau, the village has a total area of 1.64 square miles (4.24 km^{2}), of which 1.61 square miles (4.17 km^{2}) is land and 0.03 square miles (.07 km^{2}), or 1.69%, is water.

== Transportation ==
=== Major roads ===
Several two-lane highways traverse Tivoli. County Route 78—formerly New York State Route 402—is known as Broadway within the village. CR 78 ends at the Hudson River. At one time, a ferry crossed the Hudson from there to Saugerties in Ulster County.

The second highway, New York State Route 9G, runs along the eastern village border and has an intersection with CR 78. Route 9G leads north 19 miles (31 km) to the city of Hudson and south 27 miles (43 km) to Poughkeepsie, the Dutchess County seat.

=== Public transportation ===
Tivoli is provided with the services of the Bard College intracampus shuttle.

Tivoli is served by the route "C" bus run by Dutchess County Public Transit.

Transportation from New York City is available by train from Amtrak. which serves Rhinecliff, approximately 12 minutes away from Tivoli by car. The closest Metro-North station is in Poughkeepsie, New York, which is 45 minutes away.

Transportation to New York City is also available by bus from Trailways, which departs from Kingston, about 20 minutes away from Tivoli by car.

== Government ==
The government of Tivoli is made up of five elected officials, who meet at the Watts De Peyster Fireman's Hall. The hall is part of the village municipal campus, and contains the village offices. The current elected officials in Tivoli are:

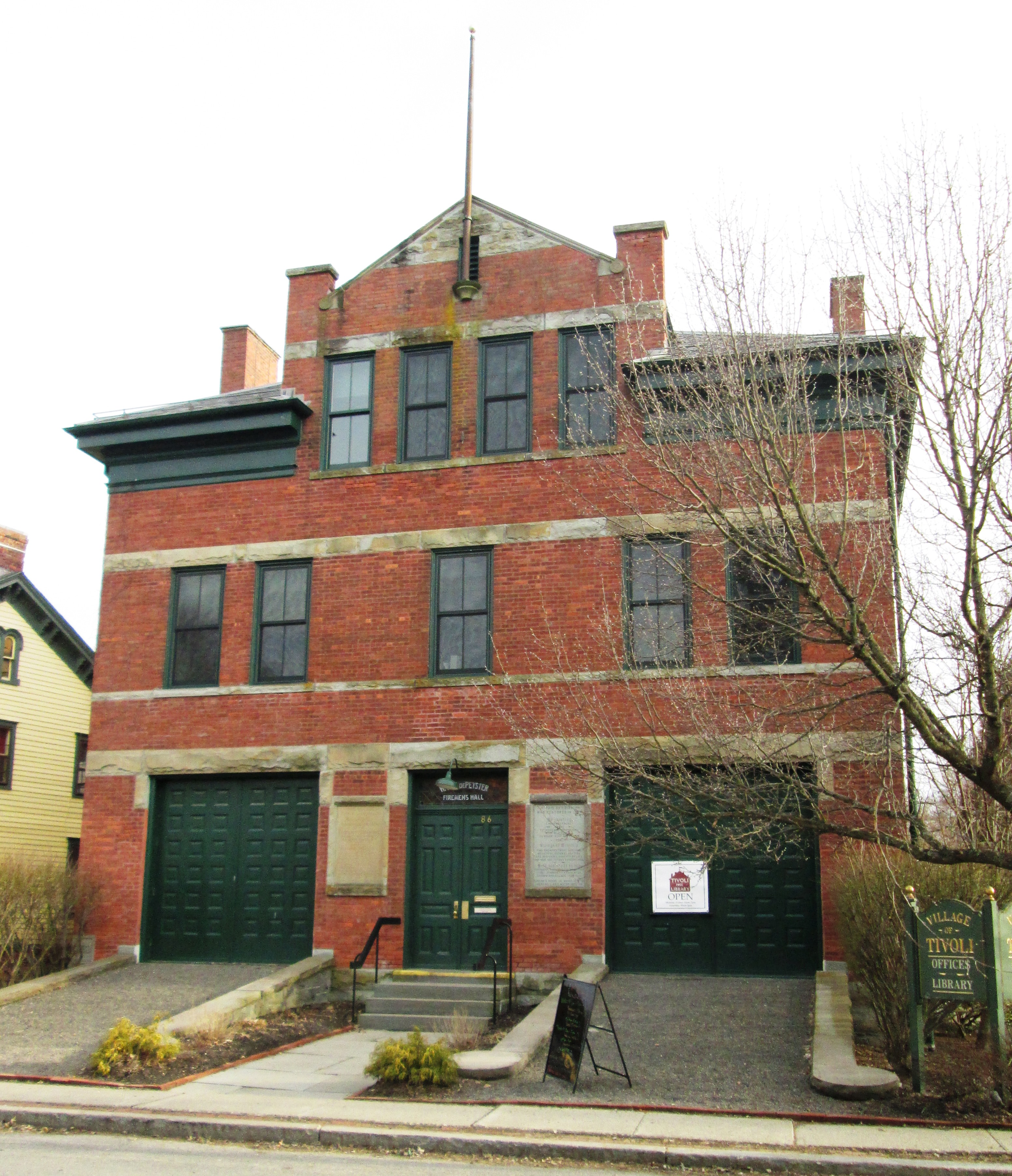
Watts De Peyster Fireman's Hall, now the village hall and public library

Elected position	Current official
Mayor	Emily M. Majer
Deputy mayor	D. William Shilling
Trustees	Peter Baldino, Sarah Imboden, Emily Mangieri

== Schools ==
Tivoli's schoolhouse, located at 71 Broadway, was established c. 1820. The "Little Red School House" was replaced in 1915 by the building currently at that site which, by 1921, served 150 students through the high school level. The building has been converted to apartments.

Children from Tivoli attend public schools in Red Hook, including:

- Mill Road Elementary School (pre-K - 5th grade) - approximately 800 students
- Linden Avenue Middle School (6 - 8) - 481 students
- Red Hook Senior High School (9 - 12) - 677 students

== Demographics ==
Historical population
Census	Pop.	Note	%±
1870	452		—
1880	1,254		177.4%
1890	1,350		7.7%
1900	1,153		−14.6%
1910	1,034		−10.3%
1920	876		−15.3%
1930	713		−18.6%
1940	761		6.7%
1950	753		−1.1%
1960	732		−2.8%
1970	739		1.0%
1980	711		−3.8%
1990	1,035		45.6%
2000	1,163		12.4%
2010	1,118		−3.9%
2020	1,012		−9.5%
U.S. Decennial Census

As of the census of 2000, there were 1,163 people, 487 households, and 261 families residing in the village. The population density was 662.1 inhabitants per square mile (255.6/km^{2}). There were 531 housing units at an average density of 302.3 per square mile (116.7/km^{2}). The racial makeup of the village was 95.7% white, 0.43% African American, 0.17% Native American, 0.95% Asian, 0.69% from other races, and 2.06% from two or more races. Hispanic or Latino of any race were 2.92% of the population.

There were 487 households, out of which 30% had children under the age of 18 living with them, 40.7% were married couples living together, 9.4% had a female householder with no spouse present, and 46.4% were non-families. Of all households 31.4% were made up of individuals, and 8% had someone living alone who was 65 years of age or older. The average household size was 2.38 and the average family size was 3.10.

In the village, the population was spread out, with 23.8% under the age of 18, 16.8% from 18 to 24, 28.7% from 25 to 44, 20.5% from 45 to 64, and 10.2% who were 65 years of age or older. The median age was 34 years. For every 100 females, there were 84.6 males. For every 100 females age 18 and over, there were 79.4 males.

The median income for a household in the village was $40,536, and the median income for a family was $53,393. Males had a median income of $41,375 versus $26,000 for females. The per capita income for the village was $20,478. About 6.2% of families and 17.5% of the population were below the poverty line, including 11.9% of those under age 18 and 3.8% of those age 65 or over.

== Kaatsbaan International Dance Center ==
The Kaatsbaan International Dance Center, located at 120 Broadway in Tivoli, New York, is described as a "cultural park for dance". It is a 501(c)3 non-profit organization which provides a retreat for residencies of dance companies to create or develop new works. Founded in 1990 by Gregory Cary (dancer), Bentley Roton (Broadway dancer), Martine van Hamel and Kevin McKenzie, it is located on the former 153-acre Tivoli Farms, purchased in 1997, which was once the "equestrian playground" for Eleanor Roosevelt. The grounds include a "music barn" designed by Stanford White which is designated for restoration and renovation.

== In popular culture ==
- In the series finale of the HBO series Girls, Marnie mentions wanting to go to a bar in Tivoli to learn about wine and hear a jazz trio.
- The town is also associated with the crime drama series Eyewitness, which is set in Tivoli, New York. Although the series portrays Tivoli as a small Hudson Valley community, filming primarily took place in Ontario, Canada, including locations around Parry Sound.
- A produce stand from Tivoli can be spotted during 102 Minutes That Changed America.

== Gallery ==
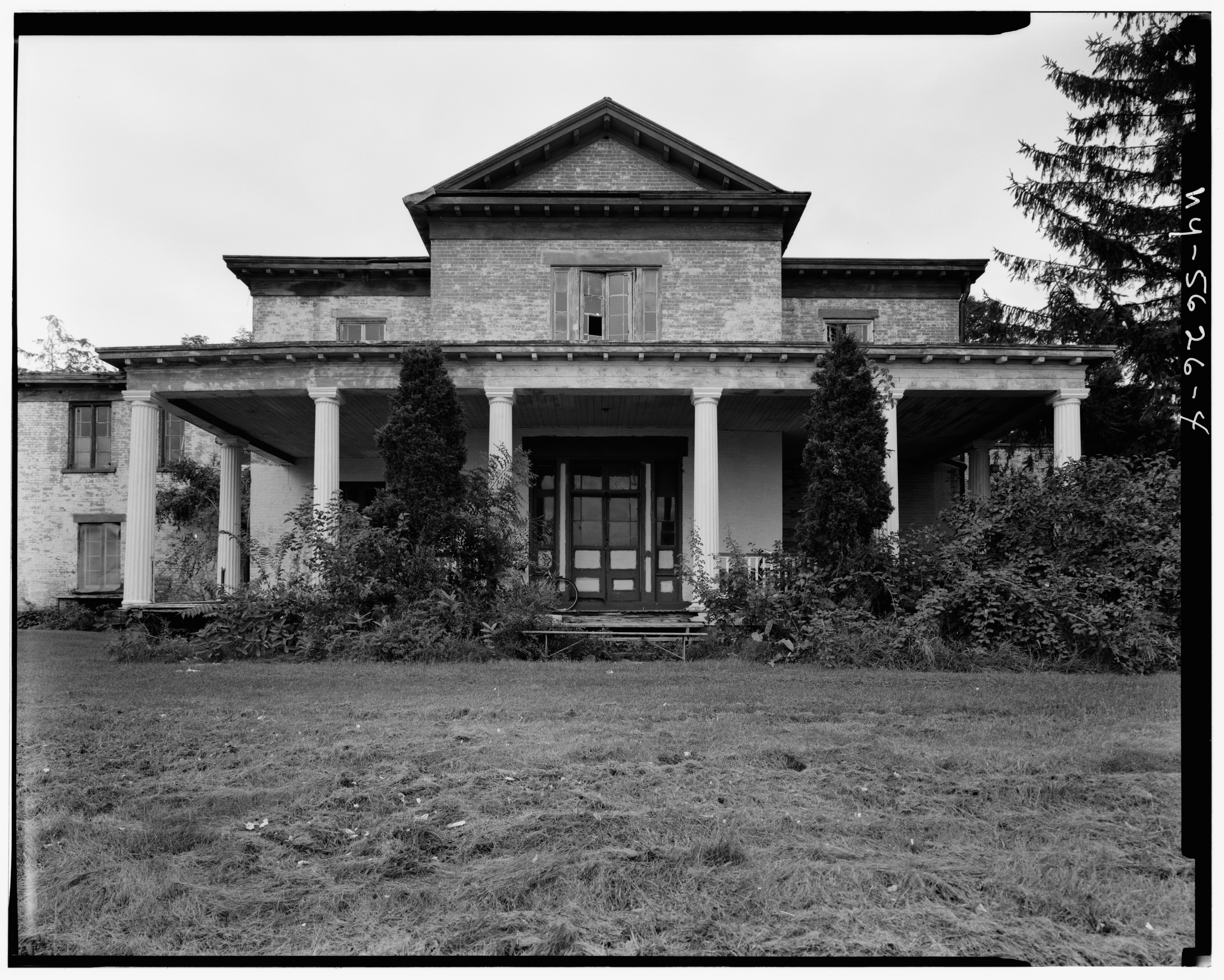
Rose Hill (HABS)

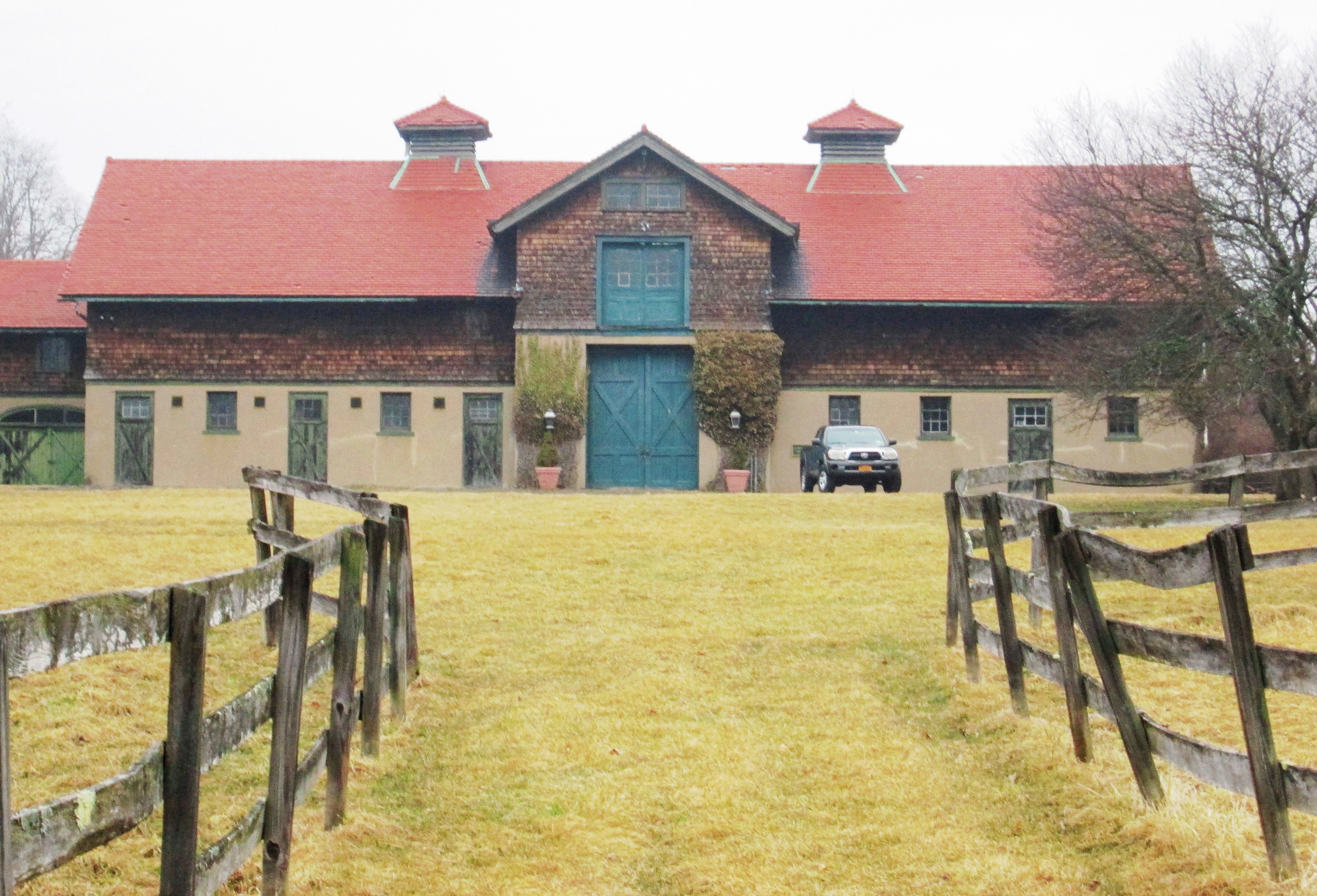
The Stanford White-designed Music Barn at Kaatsbaan International Dance Center, formerly Tivoli Farms

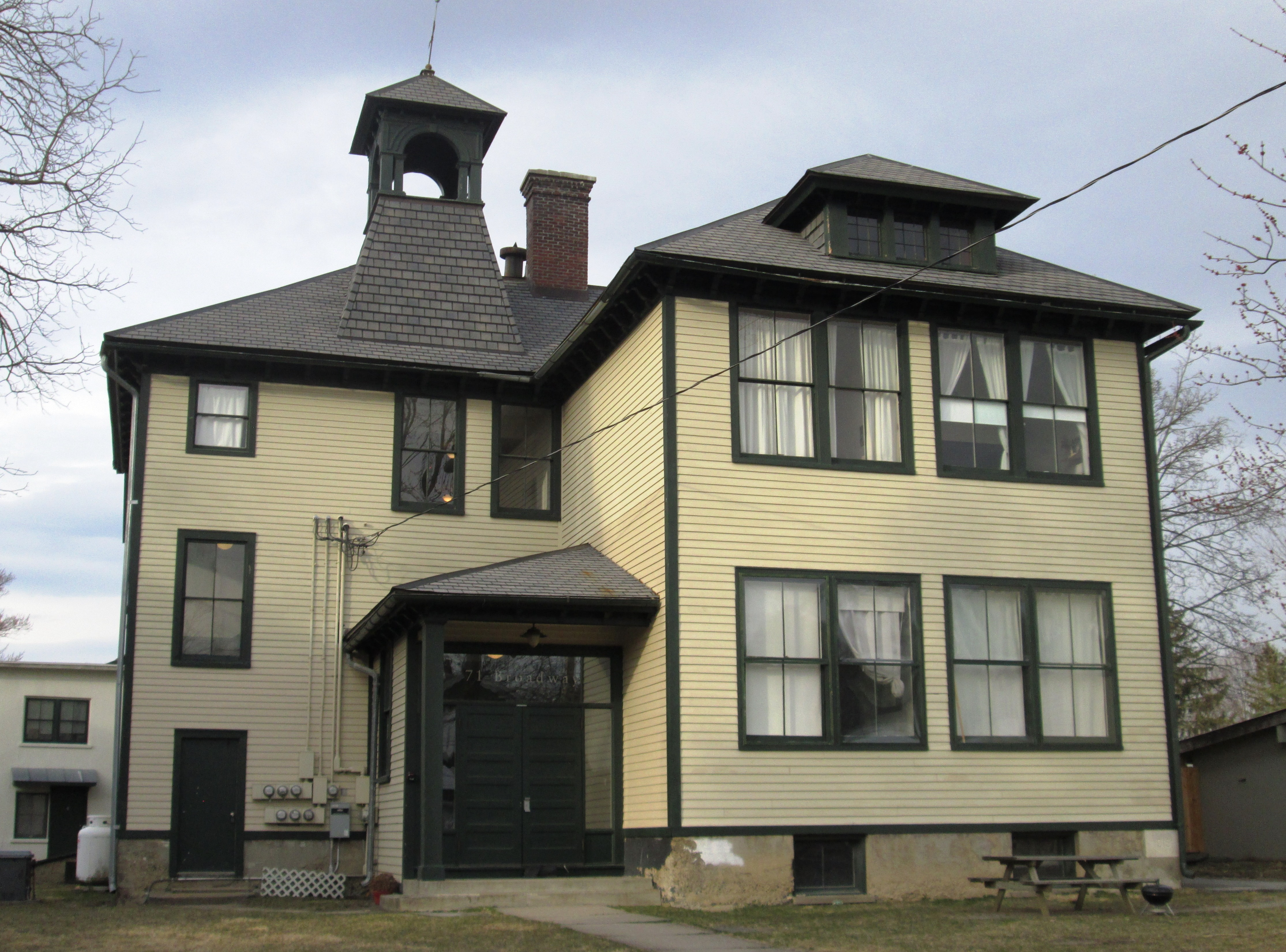
The former school house

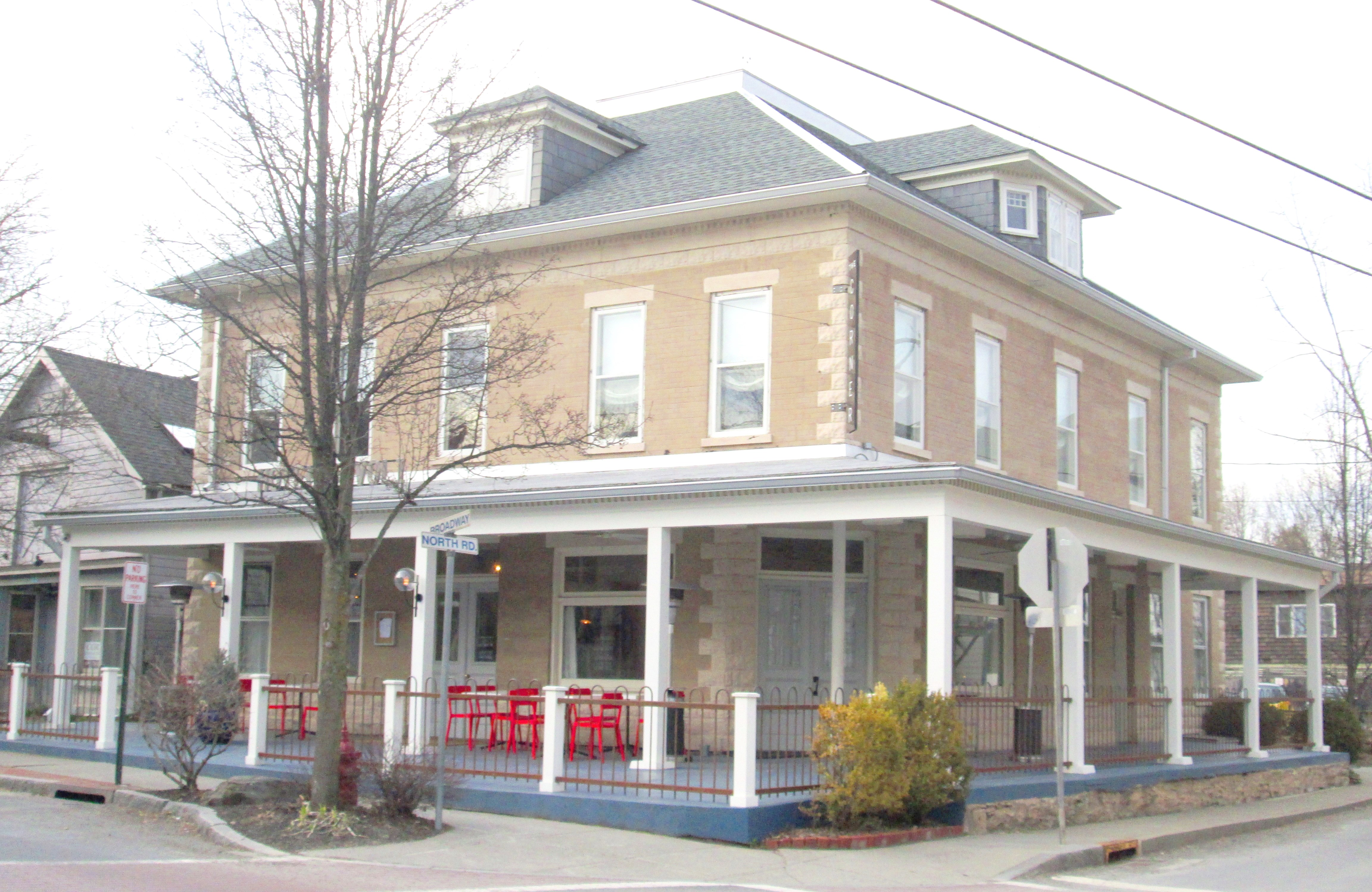
The Hotel Tivoli and The Corner restaurant

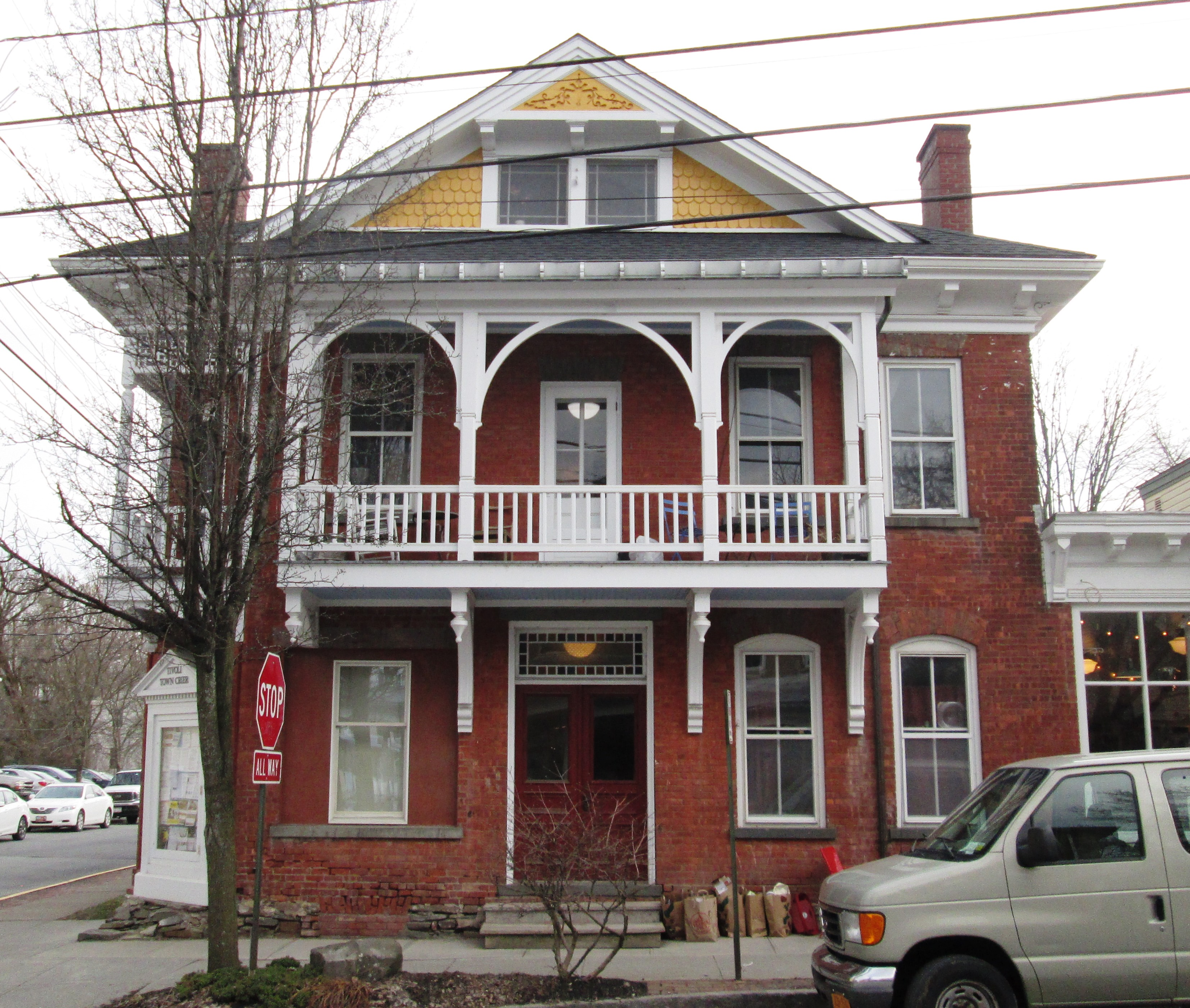
The former Potts Hotel at 54 Broadway
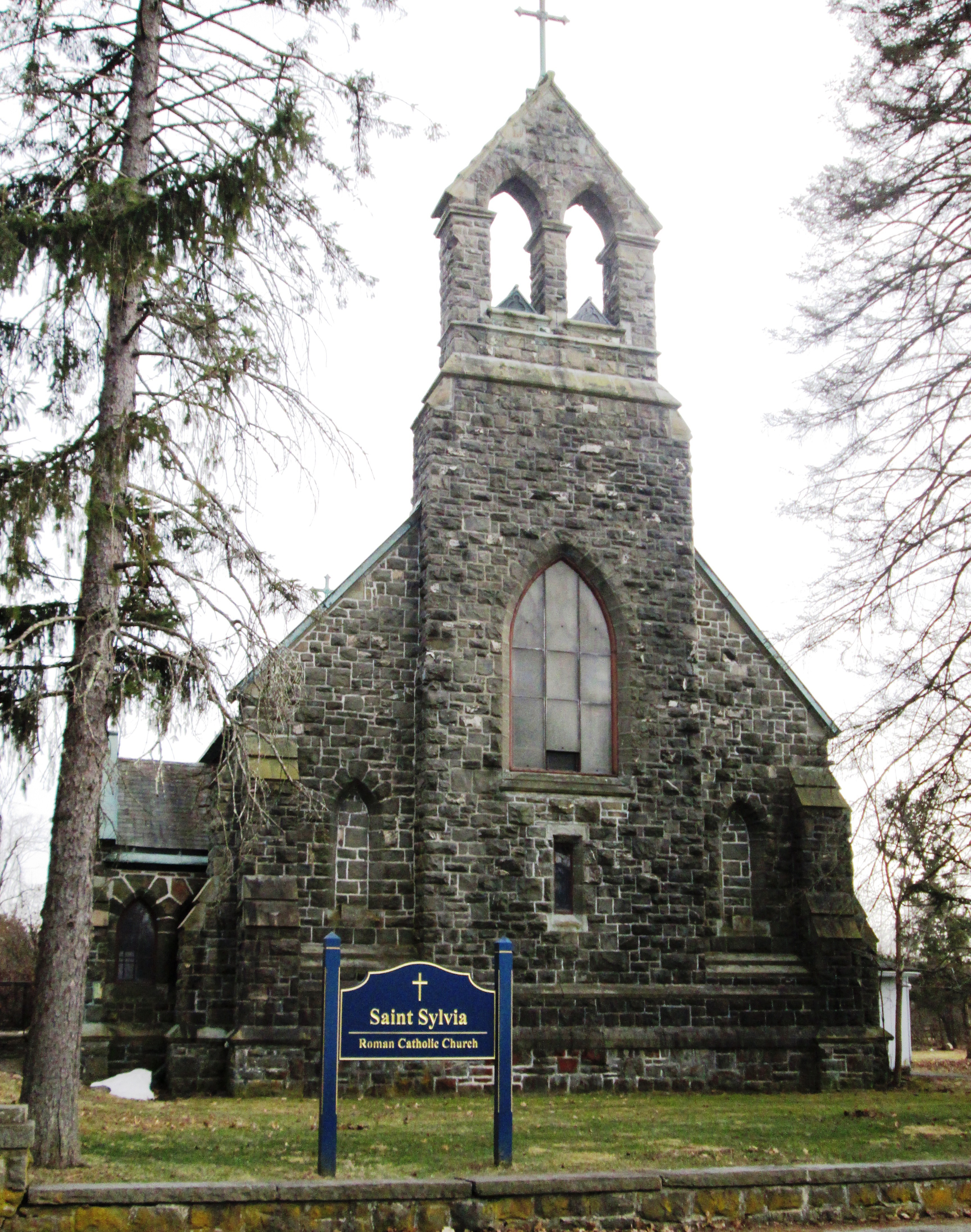
St. Sylvia's Roman Catholic Church

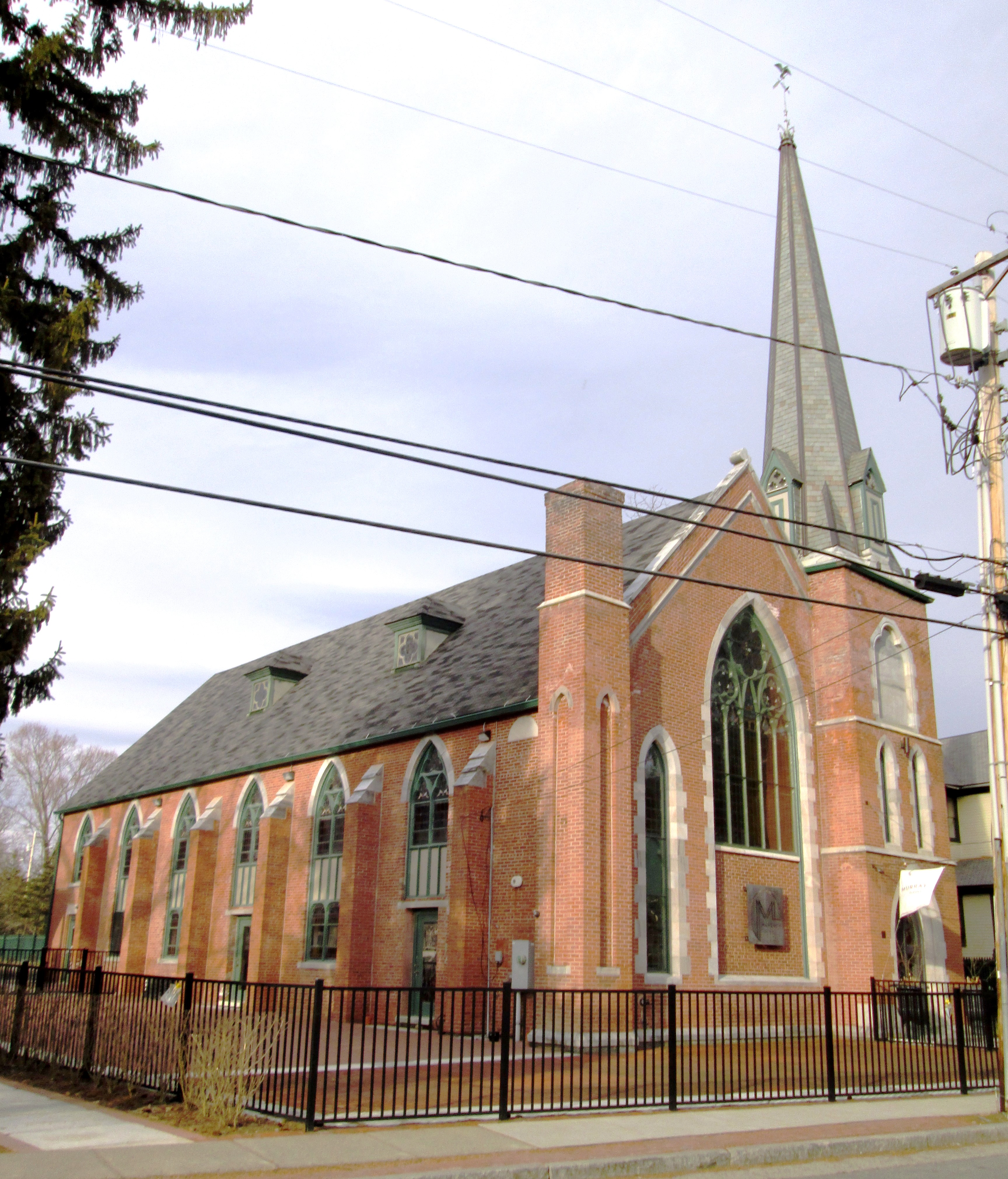
Murray's restaurant is located in this former Methodist church
