= Tech noir =

Hybrid genre of fiction, combining film noir and science fiction

TechNoir, the nightclub in The Terminator, invokes associations with both film noir and sci-fi.

Tech noir is a hybrid genre of fiction, particularly film, combining film noir and science fiction, epitomized by Ridley Scott's Blade Runner (1982) and James Cameron's The Terminator (1984). The tech-noir presents "technology as a destructive and dystopian force that threatens every aspect of our reality". It can be characterized by dark, urban settings, while depicting technology ranging from retrofuturism to classic futurism. Tech noir combines the high-tech worlds of sci-fi with the dark, gritty, and bleak atmosphere of film noir.

== Terminology ==
It is also known as cyber noir, future noir, neo-noir science fiction and science fiction noir. It also shares some similarities with the cyberpunk genre, although there is a noticeable difference between their tones; consistent with the genre upon which it draws influence, tech noir harbors more cynicism and emotional vacancy. Cyberpunk tends to focus on the rebellious figures on the outskirts of future societies.

== Origins ==
While Cameron was the first to coin the term "Tech Noir" in The Terminator (using it as the name of an underground nightclub), the roots of the origin are from much earlier. Just like film noir, tech noir draws on German expressionist film. Movies such as Homunculus (1916), The Cabinet of Dr Caligari (1920), and, most importantly, Metropolis (1927), all combine elements and concepts of futuristic technology with the unsettling and uncomfortable style that was common in German expressionism then. Later, as the film noir movement in America began to fade in the late 1950s, several low-budget science fiction thrillers (Indestructible Man, She Devil, The Astounding She Monster) implemented thematic and stylistic elements from film noir which paved the path for the birth of tech-noir as a firmly established genre in the 1980s, with the release of Blade Runner and The Terminator.

Beyond the implementation of noir elements into the science fiction genre, there are also noir films which predate tech noir that incorporate fears of new technology; namely, nuclear fears. Chief among these are Kiss Me Deadly (1955), Split Second (1953), and The Atomic City (1952). These films represent a shift from the golden era of classic noir into the next series of films noir. These films represent the transition period between classical noir and the soon to emerge tech noir.

== Precursors ==
The word noir, from film noir, is the French term (literally "black film" or "dark film") for American black-and-white films of the 1940s and 1950s, which always seemed to be set at night in an urban landscape, with a suitably dark subject-matter, although the treatment is often sexy and glamorous as well as stylized and violent. The genre was informed by a slew of crime novels, with Raymond Chandler's The Big Sleep and Farewell, My Lovely being notable examples. Being often typified by crime thrillers with a private detective hero and a succession of attractive, deadly heroines, the classic noir style may also be called "detective noir".

From this derive various related and subverted terms, such as neo-noir (resurgence of the form in 1960s and 1970s America); the Cold War noir (exploiting the tension and paranoia of the nuclear age); blaxploitation films, which some called black noir; Nordic noir, set in the stark landscape and apparently bland social environment of the Scandinavian countries, yet revealing a dark legacy of cruel misogyny, brutal sexual repression, and murder. From the same source comes cyber noir, also called tech noir, which may deal with intrigues and criminal enterprises in either the real world of computers and high technology, or in the virtual landscapes of a techno-generated underworld – and sometimes both.

=== Science fiction noir ===
Beginning in the 1960s, the most significant trend in film noir crossovers or hybrids has involved science fiction. In Jean-Luc Godard's Alphaville (1965), Lemmy Caution is the name of the old-school private eye in the city of tomorrow. The Groundstar Conspiracy (1972) centers on another implacable investigator and an amnesiac named Welles. Soylent Green (1973), the first major American example, portrays a dystopian, near-future world via a self-evidently noir detection plot; starring Charlton Heston (the lead in Touch of Evil), it also features classic noir standbys Joseph Cotten, Edward G. Robinson, and Whit Bissell. The movie was directed by Richard Fleischer, who two decades before had directed several strong B noirs, including Armored Car Robbery (1950) and The Narrow Margin (1952).

=== Cyber noir ===
Cyber noir, also called tech noir, deals either with dark shenanigans in the world of computers and hi-tech supernerds; or the virtual landscapes of a techno-generated underworld; or both. The term is a portmanteau that describes the conjunction of technology and science fiction: cyber- as in cyberpunk and -noir as film noir.

The related cyberpunk genre itself is another portmanteau: cyber- being the prefix used in cybernetics, the study of communication and control in living organisms, machines and organisations, although usually understood as the interface of man and machine; from Greek κυβερνήτης kubernétes, a helmsman. This, combined with punk, originally African-American slang for a young male prostitute, latterly an outsider in society, then the target and subject of punk music and subculture, where the keyword is alienation.

== Development of tech-noir ==
Minority Report's unique visual style: It was overlit, and the negatives were bleach-bypassed to desaturate the colors in the film, similar to that of neo-noir films.

The cynical and stylish perspective of classic film noir had a formative effect on the cyberpunk genre of science fiction that emerged in the early 1980s. The movie most directly influential on cyberpunk was Blade Runner (1982), directed by Ridley Scott, which pays clear and evocative homage to the classic noir mode throughout the film. (Scott would subsequently direct the 1987 neo-noir crime melodrama Someone to Watch Over Me.)

Strong elements of tech-noir also feature in Terry Gilliam's "dystopian satire" Brazil (1985) and The City of Lost Children (1995), one of two "Gilliamesque" films by Jean-Pierre Jeunet and Marc Caro that were influenced by Gilliam's work in general and by Brazil in particular (the other one being Delicatessen). Scholar Jamaluddin Bin Aziz has observed how "the shadow of Philip Marlowe lingers on" in such other "future noir" films as 12 Monkeys (Gilliam, 1995), Dark City (1998), and Minority Report (2002). The hero is subject to investigation in Gattaca (1997), which fuses film noir motifs with a scenario indebted to Brave New World. The Thirteenth Floor (1999), like Blade Runner, is an explicit homage to classic noir, in this case involving speculations about virtual reality. Science fiction, noir, and animation are brought together in the Japanese films Ghost in the Shell (1995) and Ghost in the Shell 2: Innocence (2004), both directed by Mamoru Oshii, and in films such as France's Renaissance (2006) and the Disney sequel Tron: Legacy (2010) from America.

== See also ==
- Arthouse action film
- New Hollywood
- Dystopian fiction
- Synthwave
- Art film
- Minimalist and maximalist cinema
- Postmodernist film
- Neo-noir
- Pulp noir
