= Old Carpet Factory =

Historical house in Greece

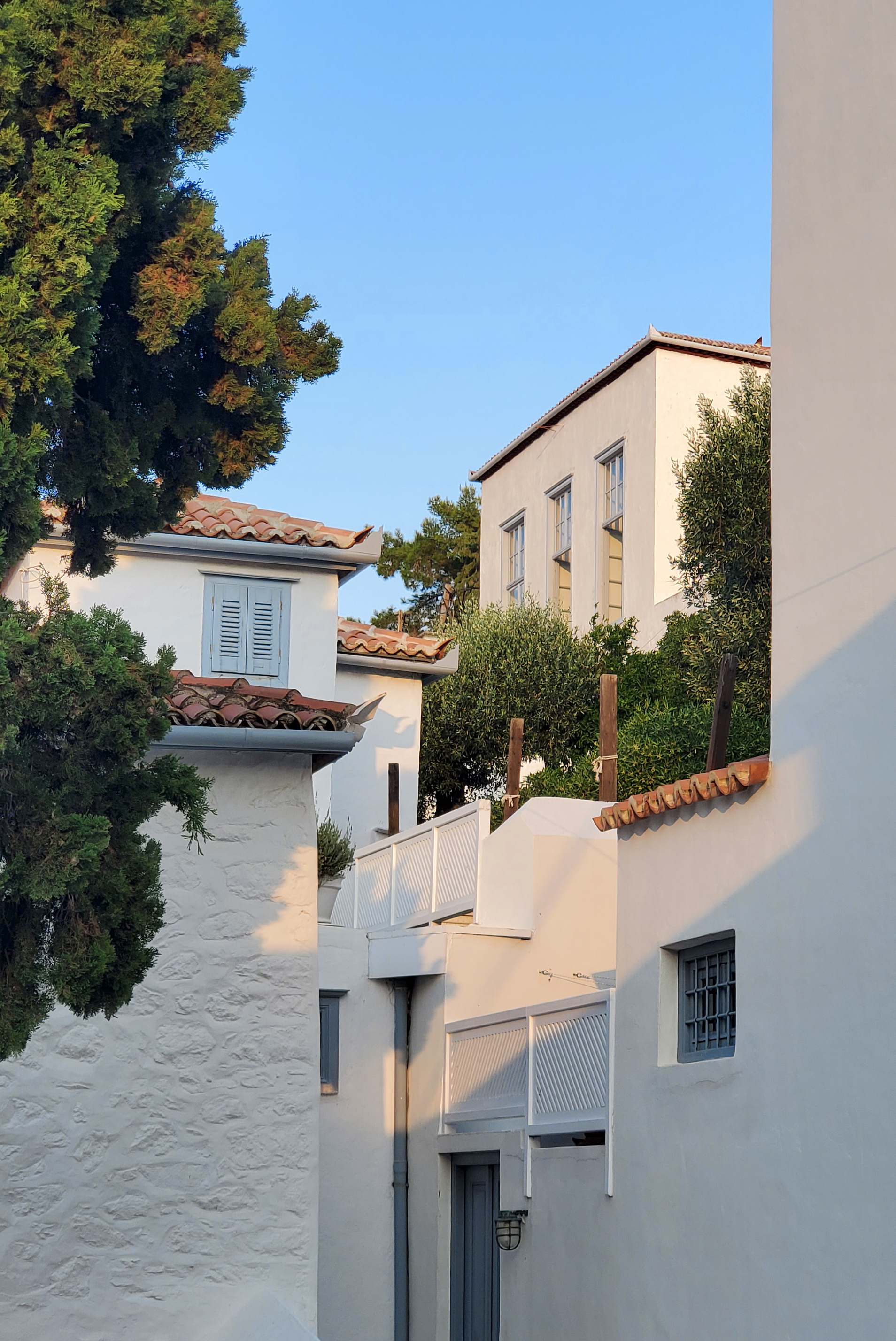
- Former name: Tsamados Residence
- Established: 18th century
- Location: Hydra Greece
- Type: Private Residence
- Owner: Colloredo-Mansfeld
- Website: www.oldcarpetfactory.com

The Old Carpet Factory is a historical mansion located in Hydra island, Greece and a private home of music producer Stephan Colloredo-Mansfeld. It was originally built for the prominent Tsamados family in the late 18th century. It has gone through many renovations and has served as a residence, as well as previously being used as an industrial school, a factory and a painting studio. The lower part of the house is now used as a recording studio.

== History ==
The family of Greek naval officer Anastasios Tsamados first built and occupied the home in the late 18th century. Its large size and ornamental architecture stand out from the more traditional homes from this period on Hydra Island, which feature lime-washed stone construction, narrow rectangular spaces, and plain roof tiles without ornament. In contrast, the Tsamados' mansion was built with open interiors, very high ceilings treated with carved wood, door casings, stone arches, geometrical designs, an open terrace overlooking the harbor, and a walled private garden. These features established it among the manors of wealthy Hydriot shipowners and captains of that era.

The house was later donated to the church and repurposed as a working weaving school under the patronage of the fames Anatolian carpet maker Nicholas Soutzoglou. It produced textiles and carpets and became known locally as the "Old Carpet Factory".

The home's artistic period began in the 1950s when American sculptor John La Farge bought it and renovated it. He removed parts of the deteriorated roof and glazed the retaining arch to create a large window, opening into a private courtyard. La Farge's arch, together with three large elegant windows, became the signature architectural feature of the house. In 1976, painter Kristina Colloredo-Mansfeld purchased the house. In 2015, the current owner, Stephan Colloredo-Mansfeld, turned the lower part of the house into a recording studio, incorporating the acoustics of high ceilings and water cisterns.

== Current use ==
From the late 20th century onward, the house became an unofficial art residency by hosting and supporting projects of artists such as Sébastien Tellier, Ariel Kalma, Margherita Chiarva, and Gorkem Sen, the inventor of yaybahar.

Currently, the mansion houses both a music recording studio and an art residency founded by curator Ekaterina Juskowski, who commissioned site-specific art installations, such as a mural (2023) by Holly Biorklund and a multi-media installation "Moonshine Bar," 2024 by Egill Sæbjörnsson.

The house can host up to twelve people.

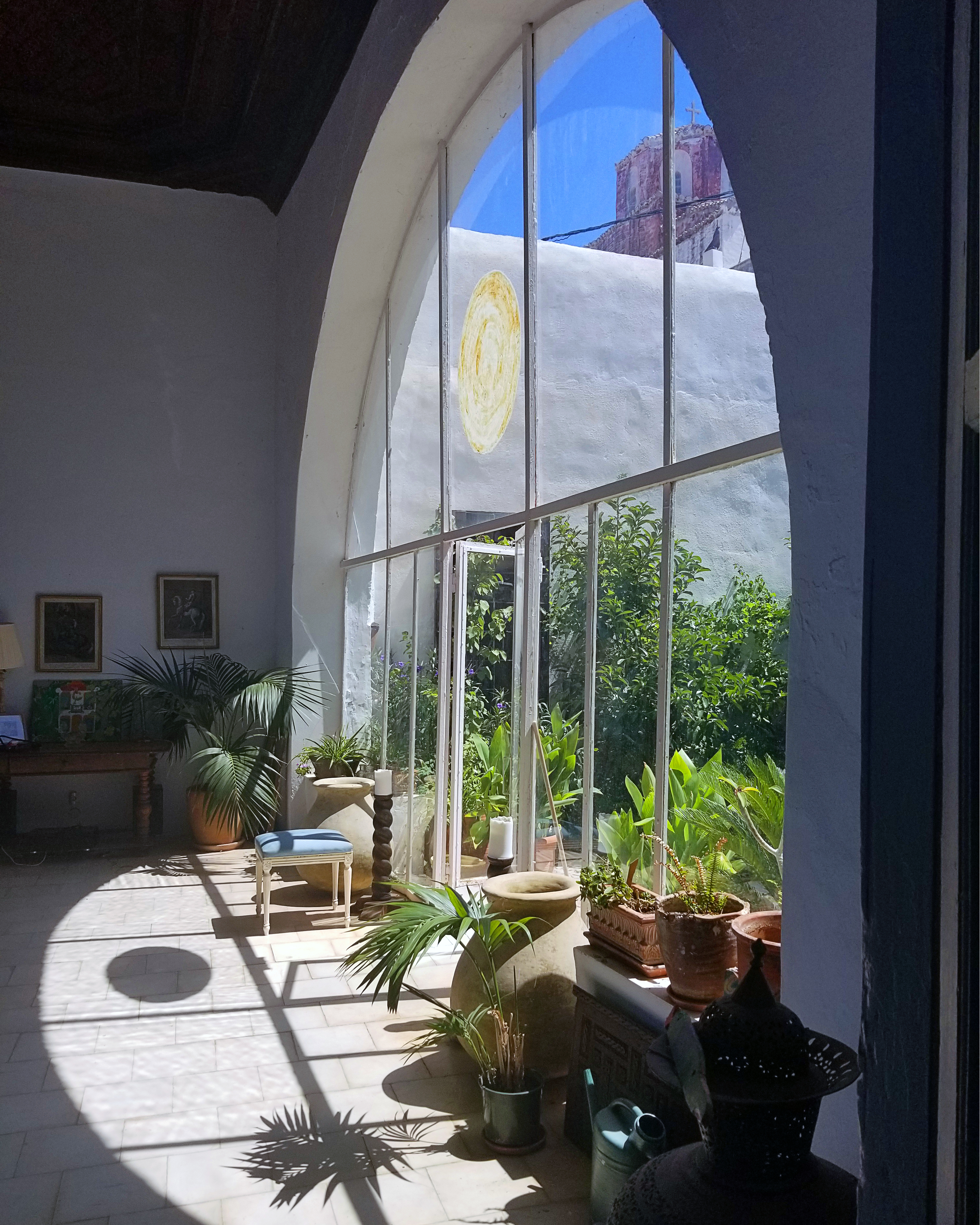
John La Farge's arch constructed in the 1950s featuring Giorgios Vogiatzakis' artwork "Curcuma Sun and Moon," 2016.

== In popular culture ==
A pulp-noir novel "De les kouventa / Δε λες κουβέντα" (“Athens Undocumented”) by French-Greek writer Makis Malafekas describes the events at the Old Carpet Factory house with one of the centre characters drawn from Stephan Colloredo-Mansfeld.

"Power of Power" EP by Sébastien Tellier and the Mind Gamers was partially composed and recorded at the Old Carpet studio with the promotional video featuring the residence and Hydra island.

Exhibition celebrating 100 years since the mansion was used as a carpet weaving factory was hosted at the house and open to the public in the summer of 2024. The exhibition showcased the antique carpet made in the mansion by Nicholas Soutzoglou in 1924 alongside woven works by Helen Marden and Dimitrios Antonitsis.

Art book "The Warp of Time" written by curator and researcher Ekaterina Juskowski recounts the history of the mansion, its owners and features contributions by several artists and writers.

== Notable owners ==
- Anastasios Tsamados, a Greek admiral of the Greek War of Independence.
- John La Farge, sculptor, and architect, the grandson of John La Farge
- Kristina Colloredo-Mansfeld, artist and a member of the Czech-Austrian aristocratic Colloredo-Mansfeld family.
- Stephan Colloredo-Mansfeld, music producer.
