= Neo-noir =

Film genre; modern form of film noir

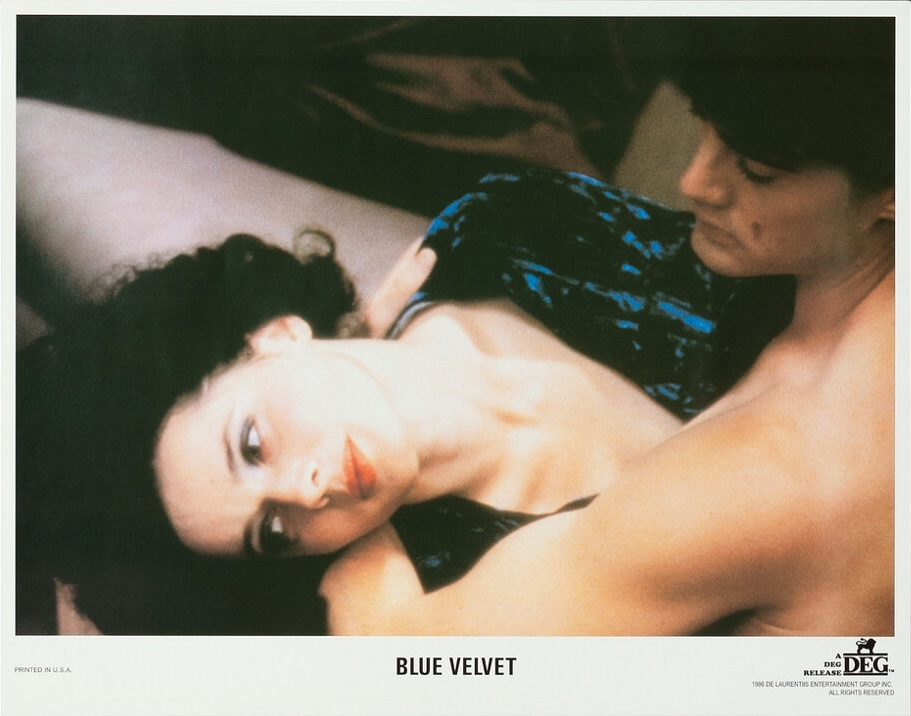
Lobby card for David Lynch's Blue Velvet (1986), an example of neo-noir.

Neo-noir is a film genre from the 1970s, in the era of New Hollywood, which is primarily associated with the subversion and visual style of classic film noir tropes, adapting the themes of 1940s and 1950s American film noir for contemporary audiences, often with vibrant colors and high-contrast, more graphic depictions of violence or sexuality, thematic motifs, and nonlinear narrative or editing.

During the 1970s and the mid 1980s, the term "neo-noir" surged in popularity, fueled by movies such as Roman Polanski's Chinatown (1974), Martin Scorsese's Taxi Driver (1976), Sydney Pollack's Absence of Malice (1981), Ridley Scott's Blade Runner (1982), Paul Verhoeven's The Fourth Man and David Lynch's Blue Velvet (1986). The French term film noir translates literally to English as "black film", indicating sinister stories often presented in a shadowy cinematographic style. Neo-noir has a similar style but with updated themes, content, style, and visual elements.

== Definition ==
The neologism neo-noir, using the Greek prefix for the word new, is defined by Mark Conard as "any film coming after the classic noir period that contains noir themes and noir sensibility". Another definition describes it as later noir that often synthesizes diverse genres while foregrounding the scaffolding of film noir.

== History ==
"Film noir" was coined by critic Nino Frank in 1946 and popularized by French critics Raymond Borde and Etienne Chaumeton in 1955. The term revived in general use beginning in the 1980s, with a revival of the style.

The classic film noir era is usually dated from the early 1940s to the late 1950s. The films were often adaptations of American crime novels, which were also described as "hardboiled". Some authors resisted these terms. For example, James M. Cain, author of The Postman Always Rings Twice (1934) and Double Indemnity (1943), is considered to be one of the defining authors of hard-boiled fiction. Both novels were adapted as crime films, the former more than once. Cain is quoted as saying, "I belong to no school, hard-boiled or otherwise, and I believe these so-called schools exist mainly in the imagination of critics and have little correspondence in reality anywhere else."

== Characteristics ==
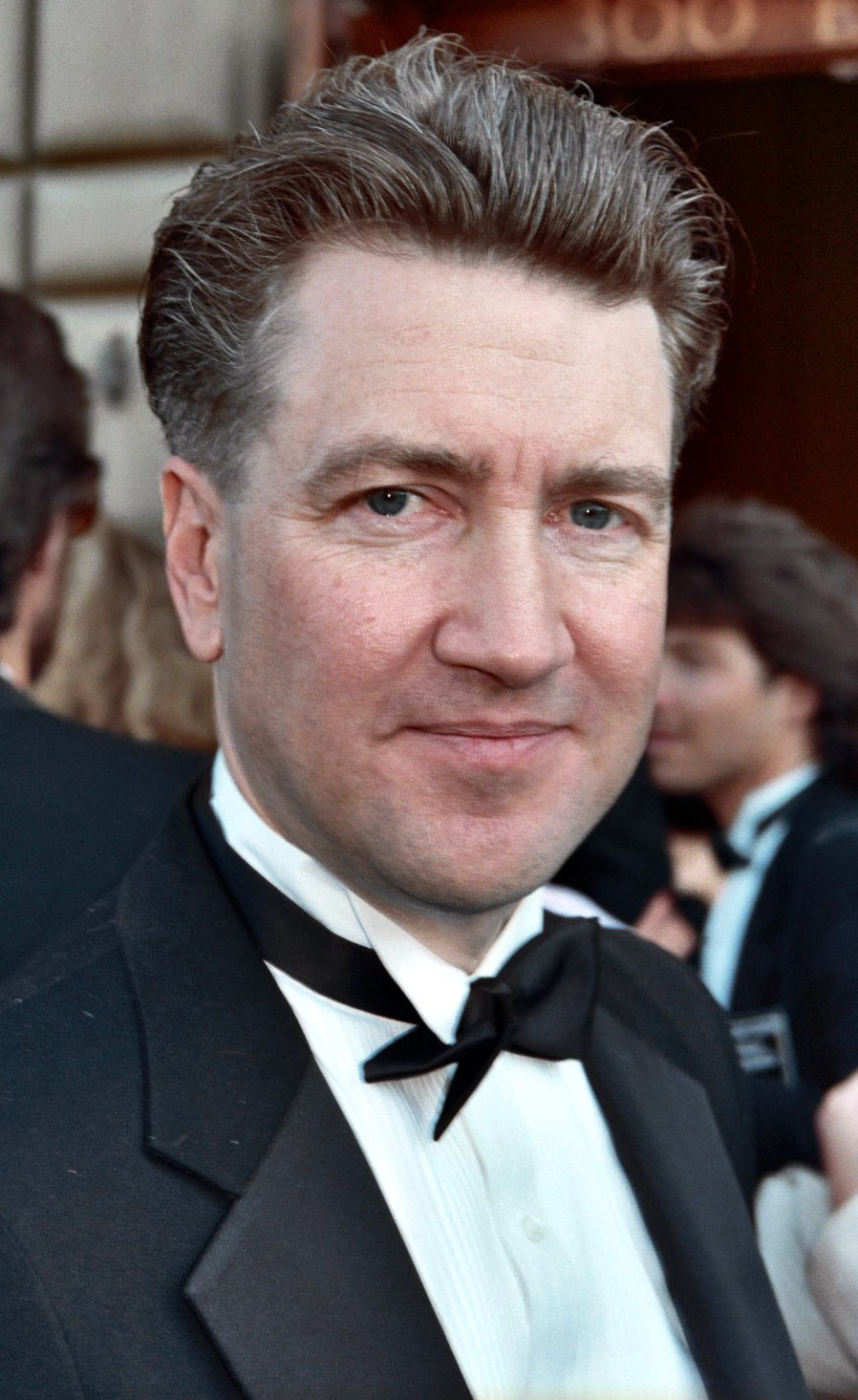
David Lynch was a principal pioneer of the genre, spanning several films he directed such as Blue Velvet (1986), Lost Highway (1997), and Mulholland Drive (2001).

Neo-noir film directors refer to 'classic noir' in the use of Dutch angles, interplay of light and shadows, unbalanced framing; blurring of the lines between good and bad and right and wrong, and thematic motifs including revenge, paranoia, and alienation.

Typically American crime dramas or psychological thrillers, neo-noir films had common themes and plot devices, and many distinctive visual elements. Characters were often conflicted antiheroes, trapped in a difficult situation and making choices out of desperation or nihilistic moral systems. Visual elements included low-key lighting, striking use of light and shadow, and unusual camera placement. Sound effects helped create the noir mood of paranoia and nostalgia.

Few major films in the classic film noir genre have been made since the early 1960s. These films usually incorporated both thematic and visual elements reminiscent of film noir. Both classic and neo-noir films are often produced as independent features.

After 1970, film critics took note of "neo-noir" films as a separate genre. Noir and post-noir terminology (such as "hard-boiled", "neo-classic" and the like) are often rejected by both critics and practitioners.

Robert Arnett stated, "Neo-noir has become so amorphous as a genre/movement, any film featuring a detective or crime qualifies." Screenwriter and director Larry Gross identifies Jean-Luc Godard's Alphaville, alongside John Boorman's Point Blank (1967) and Robert Altman's The Long Goodbye (1973), based on Raymond Chandler's 1953 novel, as neo-noir films. Gross believes that they deviate from classic noir in having more of a sociological than a psychological focus. Neo noir features characters who commit violent crimes, but without the motivations and narrative patterns found in film noir.

Neo noir assumed global character and impact when filmmakers began drawing elements from films in the global market. For instance, Quentin Tarantino's works have been influenced by Ringo Lam's 1987 classic City on Fire. This was particularly the case for the noir-inflected Reservoir Dogs, which was instrumental in establishing Tarantino in October 1992.

== See also ==
- Arthouse action film
- Mystery film
- New Hollywood
- Postmodernist film
- Pulp noir
- Tech noir
- Vulgar auteurism
