= Brice Marden =

American painter (1938–2023)

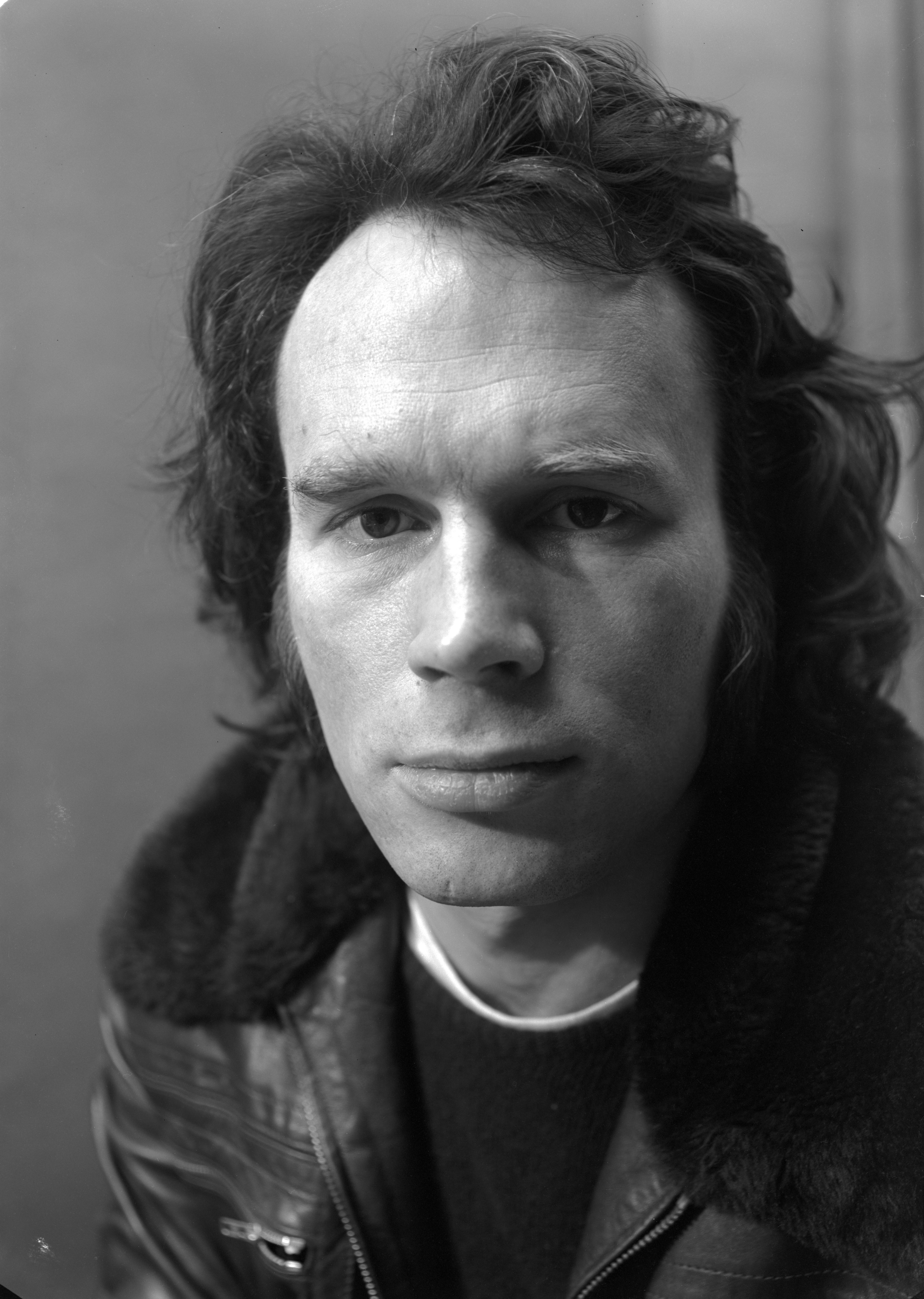
- Marden in 1975
- Born: Nicholas Brice Marden Jr. October 15, 1938; Bronxville, New York, U.S.
- Died: August 9, 2023 (aged 84); Tivoli, New York, U.S.
- Education: Boston University; Yale University
- Known for: Painter
- Notable work: Cold Mountain series; Basel Window Study series; The Propitious Garden of Plane Image
- Movement: Minimalism, abstract expressionism, color field, lyrical abstraction
- Awards: Member, American Academy of Arts and Letters

Nicholas Brice Marden Jr. (October 15, 1938 – August 9, 2023) was an American artist generally described as minimalist, although his work has roots in abstract expressionism, color field painting, and lyrical abstraction. He lived and worked in New York City; Tivoli, New York; Hydra, Greece; and Eagles Mere, Pennsylvania.

== Early life ==
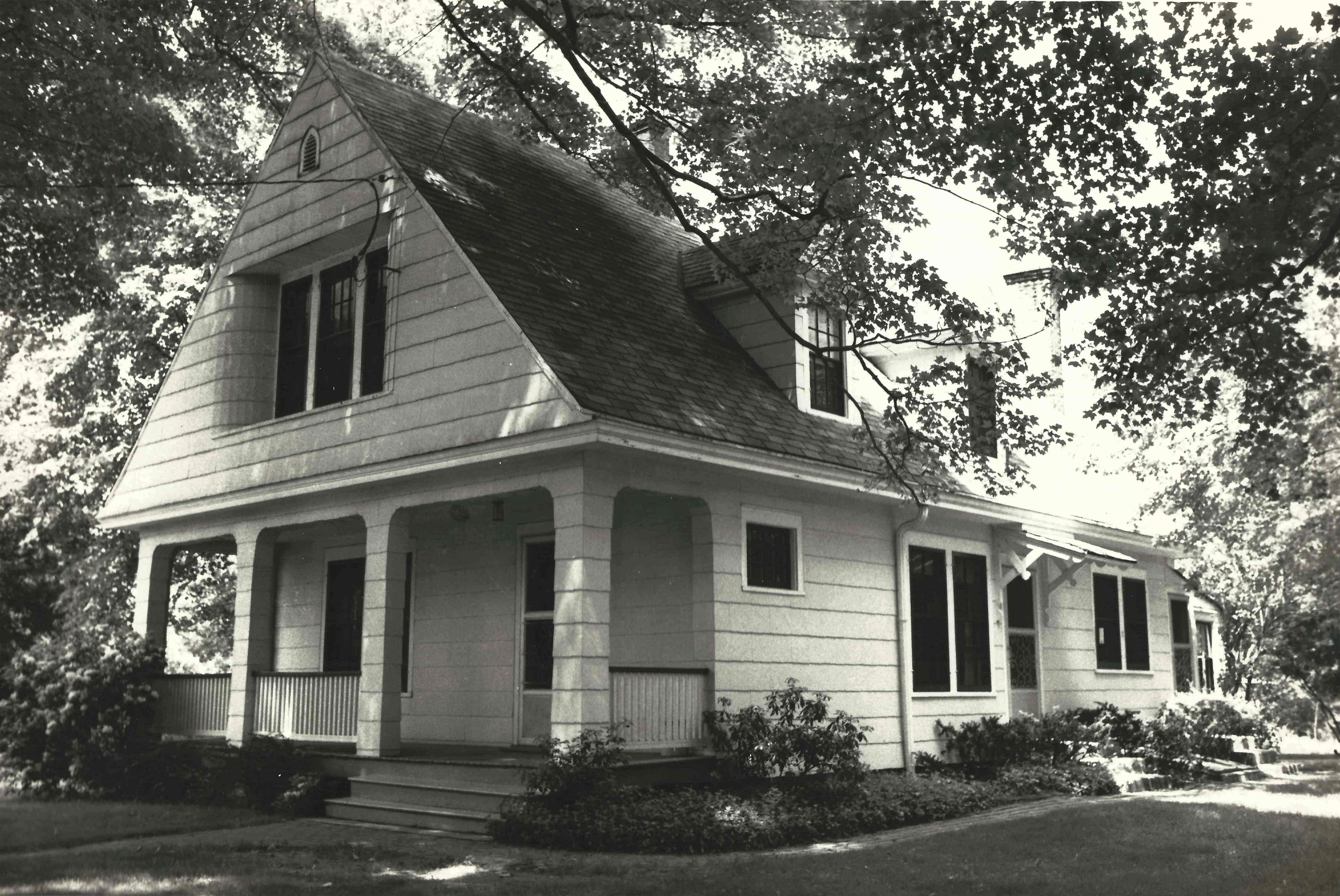
Marden's Briarcliff Manor childhood home

Nicholas Brice Marden Jr. was born in Bronxville, New York, and grew up in nearby Briarcliff Manor. He attended Florida Southern College from 1957 to 1958 before earning his B.F.A. in 1961 from Boston University School of Fine and Applied Arts. In 1963, Marden received his M.F.A. from Yale School of Art, where he studied with Esteban Vicente, Alex Katz, Jon Schueler, Jack Tworkov, Reginald Pollack, Philip Pearlstein, and Gabor Peterdi. Among his fellow students were future artists Richard Serra, Chuck Close, Janet Fish, Vija Celmins, Nancy Graves, Gary Hudson, and Sylvia and Robert Mangold. While studying art, Marden was also immersed in the American folk music revival scene, based in Cambridge, Massachusetts. His first wife, Pauline Baez, whom he married in 1960, was Joan Baez's sister. He met Bob Dylan and Pete Seeger and lived for a while at Joan Baez's house in Carmel, California.

It was at Yale that Marden developed the formal strategies that would characterize his drawings and paintings in the proceeding decades: a preoccupation with rectangular formats, and the repeated use of a muted palette. In his early work of the 1960s and 1970s, he used simplified means, typically monochrome canvases either alone or in series of panels, diptychs or triptychs. These include the works The Dylan Painting (1966); 1986 (now in the collection of San Francisco Museum of Modern Art); 1969's Fave (the Jack S. Blanton Museum of Art, University of Texas at Austin); and Lethykos (for Tonto) (1976) (The Museum of Modern Art, New York).

== Career ==
=== Early work ===
Marden relocated to New York City in 1963, where he came into contact with the work of Jasper Johns while employed as a guard at the Jewish Museum during the museum's 1964 retrospective of Johns' oeuvre. The following summer, Marden traveled to Paris, where he began to make compressed charcoal and graphite grid-patterned drawings. Marden's graphic works are a corollary to his paintings, and he would transfer ideas into even his most recent paintings and drawings. Marden made his first monochromatic single-panel painting in the winter of 1964. It was also in Paris that he admired the work of Alberto Giacometti and Jean Fautrier, although masters such as Francisco de Zurbarán, Diego Velázquez, and Édouard Manet also informed Marden's artistic practice.

In 1966, at Dorothea Rockburne's suggestion, Marden was hired by Robert Rauschenberg to work as his assistant. That same year, he had his first solo show in New York at the Bykert Gallery, which exhibited the first of his classic oil-and-beeswax paintings. Prior to that, he had worked at Chiron Press as an assistant to Steve Poleskie. Marden created the lithograph Gulf (from the New York 10-69 portfolio) in 1969 while at Chiron Press.

In the late 1960s and early '70s, a moment when painting was widely considered moribund, Marden gained international fame as the master of the monochrome panel. In 1971, Brice and his wife, Helen Harrington, visited the Greek island of Hydra, to which they returned every year thereafter. The couple bought their first home there in 1973. The light and landscape greatly influenced Marden's work (see, for instance, the five Grove Group paintings, 1972–1980; Souvenir de Grèce works on paper, 1974–1996). Executed in oil on marble fragments, he made a total of 31 paintings on marble on Hydra.

Marden's early monochromatic paintings exist as single panels, diptychs, and triptychs. In each of the four Red Yellow Blue paintings (1974), the artist painted slabs of dense yet nuanced color on three adjoined canvas panels, using oil paint mixed on the spot with melted beeswax and turpentine and applied with a knife and spatula. He gradually increased the number of panels, arranging them into post-and-lintel configurations.

Brice Marden, For Pearl, 1970, 96 1/2 in × 98 3/4 in × 2 1/8 in (245 cm × 251 cm × 5 cm), Glenstone

In 1977, Brice Marden was commissioned (after an invited art competition with artists Samuel Buri, Joseph Beuys, Alfred Jensen, Jasper Johns, Roy Lichtenstein, Penck, Robert Ryman, Antoni Tàpies, and Jim Turrell) to design the windows lining the apse of the Basel Cathedral, a project that he labored on continuously from 1978 to 1985. Influenced in part by the Rothko Chapel in Houston, Texas, which the artist visited in 1972, Marden painted with the aim of fostering a heightened spiritual environment through abstraction. Occupying the space above the altar, these windows would be central to the ritual activity of the space, and the artist spent the next seven years honing his concept to address the spiritual weight of the installation context, culminating in a limited group of Window Study paintings. After preparing designs for stained-glass windows for Basel Cathedral, he became interested in expressing in his paintings the conditions of colour and light in architecture. The Basel commission saw the artist move away from the understated encaustic monochromes that dominated his output during the 1960s and 1970s to embrace a new, vibrant palette and set of linear compositional devices. In part influenced by his growing interest in alchemy, he decided to work with combinations of colors limited to three (the Trinity) for the linear components and four (the elements – earth, air, fire, water) for the monochrome panels. While the windows were never physically fabricated, Marden's paintings for the Basel Cathedral endure as masterworks of his oeuvre because of their conceptual aims.

In 1977, Marden traveled to Rome and Pompeii, where he strengthened his interest in Roman and Greek art and architecture, which would influence his work of the late 1970s and early 1980s. Between 1981 and 1987, Marden made a total of 31 paintings on marble, all of them produced in Hydra.

=== Later work ===
In 1983, Marden and family traveled to Thailand, Sri Lanka, and India; the artist became fascinated by the art, landscape, and culture of parts of Asia. Marden subsequently incorporated numerous elements of certain Asian traditions into his work, making them one key to his process (the Shell Drawings, 1985–87). A visit in 1984 to the exhibition Masters of Japanese Calligraphy, 8th–19th Century encouraged Marden to use form, a predominant influence in his recent work—which can be seen in his acclaimed Cold Mountain series, both paintings and works on paper, 1989–1991. Combining airy calligraphic scaffoldings of line with whitish or palely tinted backgrounds, these 9-by-12-foot paintings were the biggest Marden had created up to that point. An infatuation with Chinese calligraphy and poetry helped spark the change in his art toward line and gesture, works inspired by the free-spirited eighth-century Chinese hermit and poet of that name (en: Cold Mountain – Han Shan, in Chinese). At first, lines in Marden's paintings and drawings were arranged in neat rows, like Chinese writing. But the lines have got looser, and hence more evocative of landscapes and figures. As a Minimalist, Marden was concerned with grids and patterns. Looking to add freedom to his work without abandoning order, he found Chinese calligraphy inspiring, with its system of drawing characters in rows.

In 2000, Marden embarked on The Propitious Garden of Plane Image, the longest two of which measure 24 feet. Writing in The New Yorker in 2006, the critic Peter Schjeldahl described Marden as "the most profound abstract painter of the past four decades".

== Exhibitions ==
Marden participated in hundreds of group exhibitions, and his work has also been the subject of numerous one-person shows and retrospectives. His first solo show in New York was held at the Bykert Gallery in 1966. In 1972, his work was showcased at Documenta 5 in Kassel, Germany. His first museum show was the 1975 retrospective at the Solomon R. Guggenheim Museum in New York City. In 1991, Marden was a participant in the Connections series of the Museum of Fine Arts, Boston, for which the artist juxtaposed about three dozen of his abstract canvases and works on paper and marble with works from the permanent collection by the likes of Édouard Manet, Paul Gauguin, Goya, James Ensor, and Francisco de Zurbarán. In the fall of 2006, New York's Museum of Modern Art presented "Brice Marden: A Retrospective of Paintings and Drawings". The MoMA called the exhibition "an unprecedented gathering of [Marden's] work, with more than fifty paintings and an equal number of drawings, organized chronologically, drawn from all phases of the artist's career." The show traveled to the San Francisco Museum of Modern Art in early 2007, and finally to Berlin's Hamburger Bahnhof, Museum für Gegenwart in the summer of that year. Originally, Marden was not enthusiastic about the idea. The works were divided into two periods: from the mid-sixties to the mid-eighties and then the mid-eighties up to the present. However, in the end it allowed the artist to reassess his previous works and focus on future works.

== Personal life ==
In 1960, Brice Marden married Pauline Baez (sister of Joan) and together they had a son, Nicholas. The marriage to Pauline ended a few years later and by 1968 he was remarried to artist Helen Marden. He and Helen Marden have two daughters, Mirabelle and Melia. Brice Marden's son, Nick Marden, is a bassist who has participated in the New York punk scene since the late 1970s playing in bands such as the Stimulators and False Prophets. The Mardens' daughter Mirabelle Marden was a proprietor of Rivington Arms, an art gallery in New York. She is also a photographer. Melia Marden is the chef of the New York restaurant group The Smile.

From 1987 to 2000, Marden's studio was located on the Bowery. At the time of his death, the artist had a Manhattan studio in a 10th-floor penthouse duplex on West Street with around 5,000 square feet of space and one two-story window looking onto the Hudson River. The Mardens bought an estate in Tivoli, New York, called Rose Hill, in 2002. At its center is a stately 1843 main house on a cliff overlooking the Hudson River. The studio was carved out of an old carriage house and has been converted into a large, light-filled space with western and northern exposures. At Rainbow Farms, the family's 400-acre summer residence in Eagles Mere, Pennsylvania, since 1991, an old barn was converted to a third workspace with almost no natural light. On Hydra, Marden and his wife traded up houses (as they did elsewhere), moving into the current one in 1989. In 2006, the couple bought a fifth property, Golden Rock Inn, on the Caribbean island of Nevis, with plans to build yet another studio there.

=== Death ===
Brice Marden died at his home in Tivoli, New York, on August 9, 2023, at the age of 84.

== Honors ==
In 1988, Marden became a member of the American Academy of Arts and Letters. In 2000, Brown University awarded the artist an honorary degree of Doctor of Fine Arts.

== Art market ==
Marden was represented by the Gagosian Gallery from 2017 on. He had previously worked with the Matthew Marks Gallery for more than twenty years.

One of Marden's paintings sold for nearly $3 million at Christie's in May 2006. Marden's Cold Mountain I (Path) (1988–89) managed to almost double his auction record from May 2008 when it sold at Sotheby's for $9,602,500 on a $10–15 million estimate. In 2013, Steven A. Cohen sold The Attended (1996–9) for $10.9 million at Sotheby's New York. On July 10, 2020, an abstract painting by Brice Marden Complements (2004–2007) sold at Christie's for $30,920,000. The result brought a new auction record for Marden, almost tripling the artist's previous milestone of $10.9 million, which had been paid for his striped canvas Number 2 at Sotheby's in November 2019. Auction prices for Marden are now almost as high as those for an old master like Rembrandt, whose current auction record is $33.2 million.
