= Ariel Kalma =

French composer and musician (1947–2025)

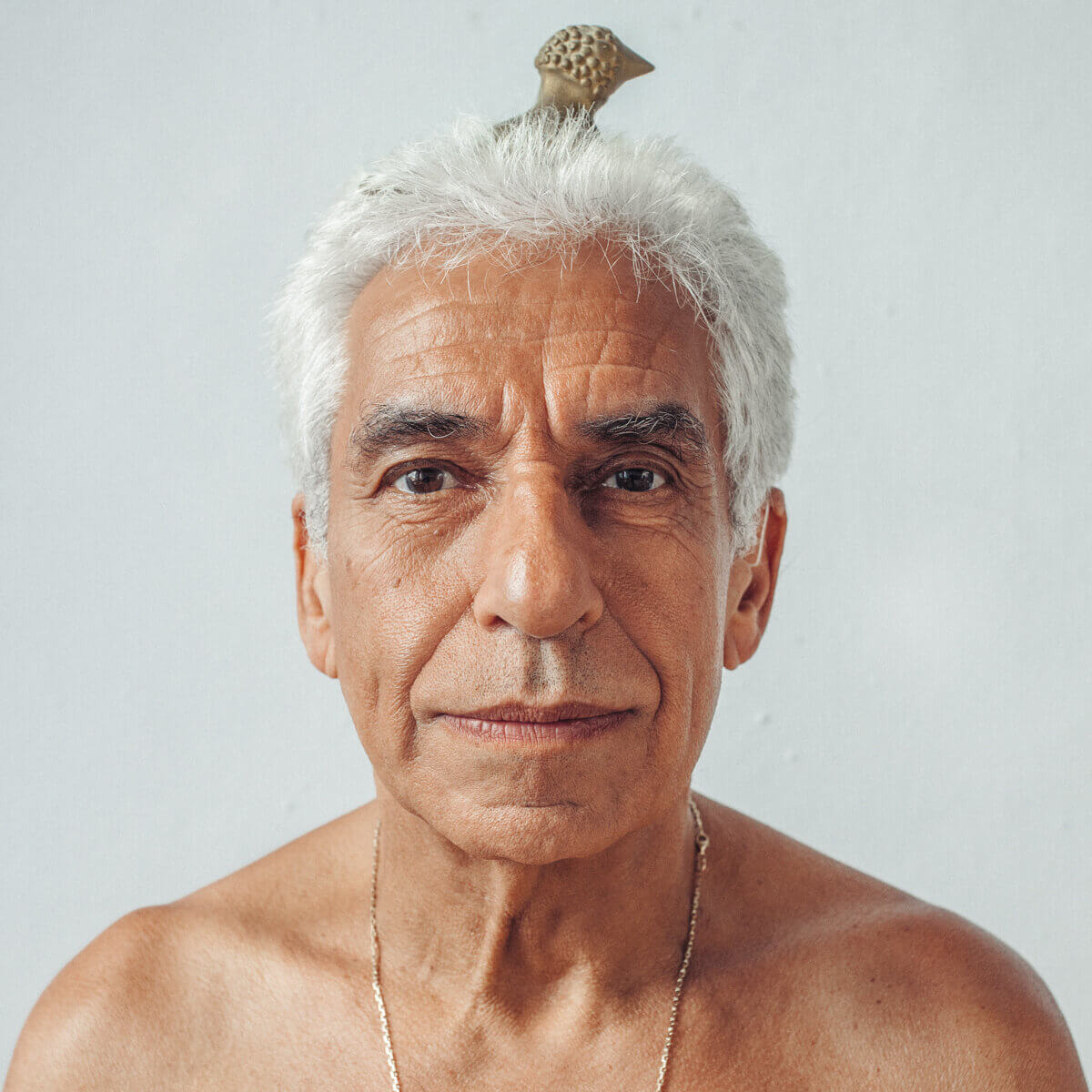
- Born: 1947; Paris, France
- Died: 4 June 2025 (aged 78)
- Occupations: Composer, musician

Ariel Kalma (born Ariel Kalmanowicz; 1947 – 4 June 2025) was a French new-age composer and electronic musician.

== Life and career ==
Kalma learned to play recorder and saxophone as a youth. He studied computer science in college, and while at university he met Salvatore Adamo, who soon hired Kalma into his touring band on a world tour as a saxophonist and flautist. While on the road with Adamo, he met Baden Powell, with whom he would collaborate in France and Germany in the late 1960s and early 1970s. Around this time, he made experimental tape pieces using his own recorded instruments, found sounds, church organs, and poetry.

In 1974 he took a one-way flight to India, learning rudimentary classical Indian music and developing an interest in meditative and drone music. He was also influenced by American minimalist music. In 1975, he recorded and self-released an album, Le Temps des Moissons while working at the GRM studio of INA Pierre Henry in Paris. His 1978 album Osmose features Borneo rainforest nature sounds recorded by Richard Tinti.

Kalma's output increased over the 1980s and 1990s, and his discography now runs to several dozen albums. In 2014, his 1970s work was collected by RVNG and a compilation, An Evolutionary Music, was released. This album reached #9 on the Billboard New Age albums chart in 2015.

In 2019 he visited Hydra Island and recorded an album with Gorkem Cen playing yaybahar at the Old Caroet Factory.

For over five decades he released LPs, cassettes, and CDs of solo compositions and collaborations that all live on his personal website and Bandcamp page.

Ariel Kalma died on 4 June 2025, at the age of 78, peacefully in the arms of his beloved son.

== Albums ==
- Le Temps des Moissons (1975 LP)
- Voyage méditatif au centre de la tête (archive 1978, digital 2014)
- Osmose (1978 LP)
- Interfréquence (1980 LP)
- Musique Pour Le Rêve et L'Amour (1981 Cassette, 2016 LP)
- Open Like A Flute (1982 Cassette, 2015 LP)
- Bindu (1984 cassette)
- Tropical (1985 cassette)
- Rainbow (1985 cassette)
- Serenity (1989 CD)
- Flowing Dreams (1994 archive, 2010 CD)
- Flute for the Soul (1997 CD)
- My Sax, my Love (1997 CD)
- In My Dreams (1996 archive, 2009 CD)
- Endless Breath (1983 archive, 2010 CD)
- Chansons d'Esprit - Poésie sonore *Flowing Dreams (1981 archive, 2006 CD)
- Spirit Dancer (2005 CD)
- Galactica Electronica (2012 CD)
- Lazy Lizard (2009 CD)
- Osmose 2 (2008 CD)
- Chillout India (2007 CD)
- Yo Yo A New Man (1981 archive, 2013 CD)
- Yo Yo Homme Nouveau (1981 archive, 2013 CD)
- Open Like a Flute, Vol 1+2 (2015 double LP)
- An Evolutionary Music: Original Recordings 1972-1979 (2014)
- FRKWYS Vol. 12: We Know Each Other Somehow (2015 Double LP, CD)
- Meditation in the Forest (2015 CD)
- Réallusions (2015 CD)
- Rue de la Gaité (1976-79 archives, 2017 downloads)
