= Ekaterina Juskowski =

American writer, curator and activist

Ekaterina Juskowsi
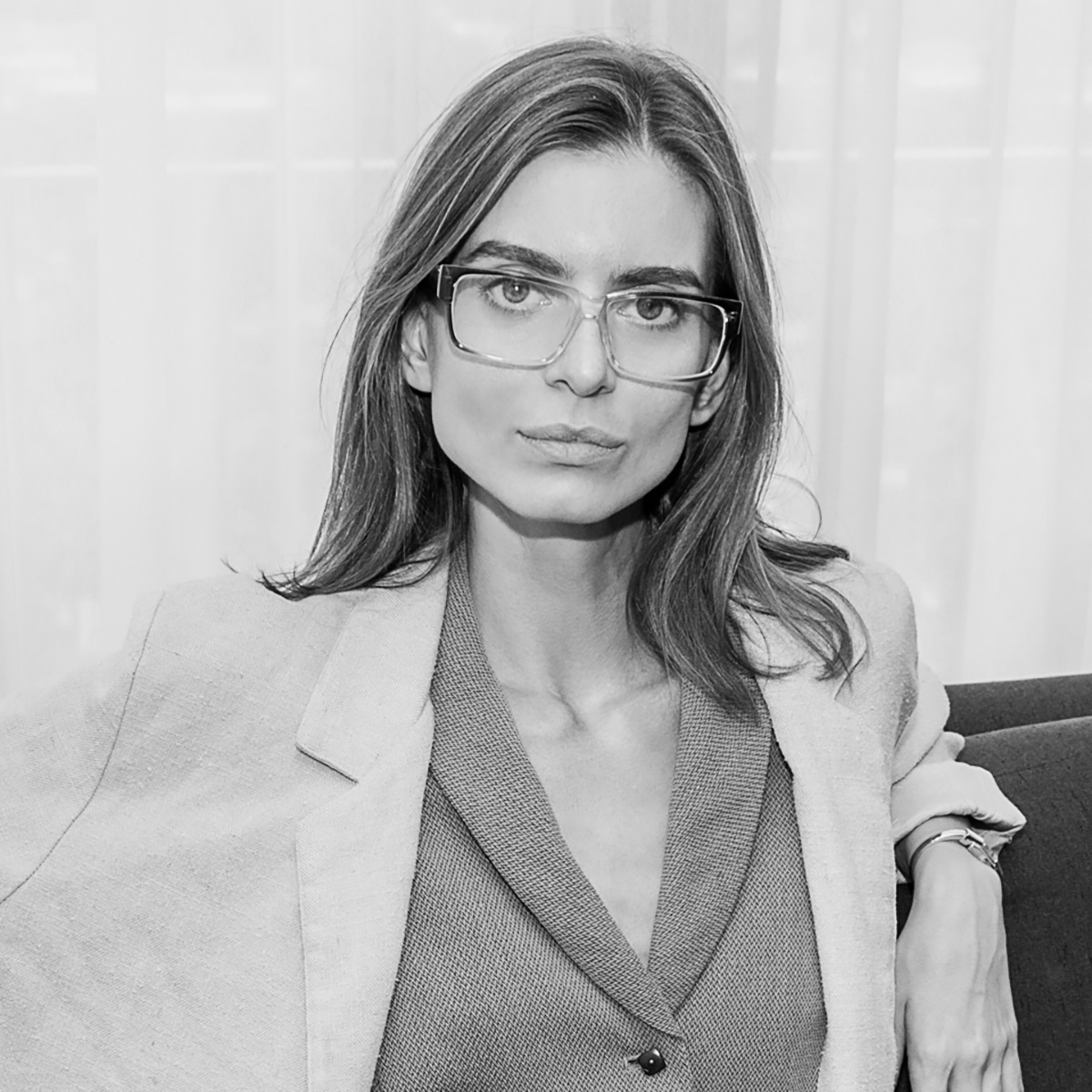
- Born: Moscow, Russia
- Citizenship: American
- Occupations: Writer; photographer
- Website: www.juskowski.com

Ekaterina Juskowski is a Russian-born American curator and writer whose work connects posthumanism, cultural memory and place. She is the founder of the feminist organization Miami Girls Foundation and the Hydra Art Residency at the Old Carpet Factory in Greece.

== Education and early life ==
Juskowski was born in Moscow, Russia, and moved to the United States at the age of 18 to pursue studies in art and photography. Her academic interests later expanded to include sociology, with a focus on gender politics and urban spaces. Influenced by French Dada poets and feminist theory, her early work explored the questions of identity, gender politics, representation, and public space. Juskowski studied ballet in Russia through the Vaganova Method. She described this training as an introduction to broader cultural history through literature, music, film, and visual art.

== Work ==
Juskowski’s curatorial and photographic work is characterized by its immersive and research-driven approach. Her projects explore cultural heritage, its transmission, and the role of the contemporary art in reactivating disappearing cultural practices. She has been recognized for integrating traditional craft and contemporary art in ways that honor local heritage in the context of global dialogue. Her work has been shown at Untitled Art Fair during Art Basel Miami Beach, Coral Gables Museum, HistoryMiami Museum, Hydra School Projects Her work appeared in Gagosian Quarterly, Monday to Sunday Athens book, CondeNast Traveler, Scenario Magazine.

In 2019, Juskowski launched the Hydra Art Residency at the Old Carpet Factory, designed to document and preserve the island’s cultural heritage while supporting contemporary artistic practices on Hydra Island, Greece. In 2024 she curated the "Warp of Time" art exhibition featuring works of Helen Marden. In 2025 she curated a project "Hydra: Island in the Sound" featuring "Fountains" series by artist Dimitrios Antonitsis and soundscapes by Angela Tisner.

== Writing ==
Juskowski contributes to various publications writing about art and culture. She is the author of the book "The Warp of Time" published in 2024 and "Hydra: Island in the Sound" published in 2025.

== Curatorial Work ==
Juskowski's curatorial practice is characterized by an interdisciplinary and site-specific approach that examines the relationship between posthumanism, cultural heritage, memory, identity, material culture, and place. Across exhibitions staged in museums, heritage sites, cultural institutions, landscapes, and international art fairs, she has developed projects that bridge contemporary art with history, philosophy, literature, social engagement, and local narratives. Her exhibitions frequently activate the historical, architectural, or environmental context of a site, treating placemas an integral component of storytelling. She has curated exhibitions that position artworks within broader intellectual and social frameworks, connecting material and symbolic forms, and individual experience with collective history.

== Activism ==
In 2015, Juskowski founded the Miami Girls Foundation, a nonprofit media platform aimed at challenging stereotypes and amplifying the voices of women leaders in South Florida. The foundation uses multimedia campaigns and public programming to highlight the contributions of women in business, technology, art, and activism. It also addresses systemic issues such as the gender wealth gap and underrepresentation of women founders in venture capital.

In 2017 Juskowski documented participants of the Women's March in Miami Bayfront Park for Miami Girls Foundation. She profiled many feminist leaders of South Floria, including Patricia Ireland, Marleine Bastien, Ruth Shack, Daniella Levine-Cava, Rebecca Fishman-Lipsey and others

In April 2026, Juskowski was a keynote speaker at the Women of the World at Stavros Niarchos Foundation Cultural Center in Athens alongside the founder of the MeToo movement Tarana J. Burke; author and social commentator Rumena Bužarovska, musician and activist Imany and Indian-born British Bangladeshi social economist Naila Kabeer.
