= Helen Marden =

American artist

Helen Marden (born 1941) is an American artist. Marden, née Helen Harrington, was born in Pittsburgh and studied at Pennsylvania State University. Her work is included in the collections of the Whitney Museum of American Art and the Princeton University Art Museum.

== Exhibitions ==
2024 - "The Grief Paintings." Gagosian Gallery, New York.

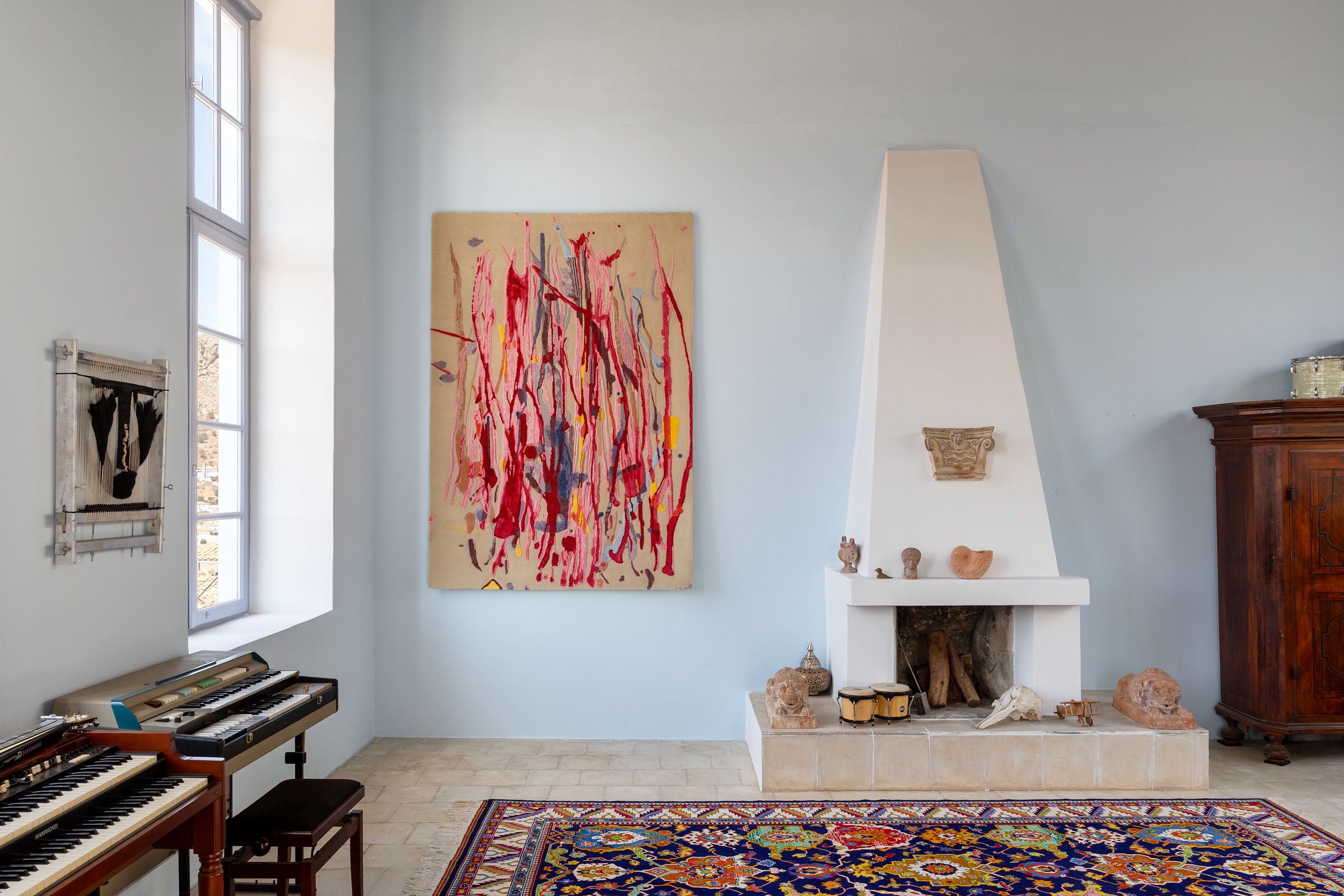
Helen Marden's work at the Old Carpet Factory mansion during The Warp of Time exhibition curated by Ekaterina Juskowski. Hydra Island, 2024.

2024 - "The Warp of Time." Old Carpet Factory, Hydra Island, Greece.

2023 - "Agape/Αγάπη." Gagosian Gallery, Athens, Greece.

2021 - "Bitter Light a Year." Gagosian Gallery, New York.

2019 - "Tivoli." Gagosian Gallery, New York.
