= Pulp noir =

Fiction subgenre

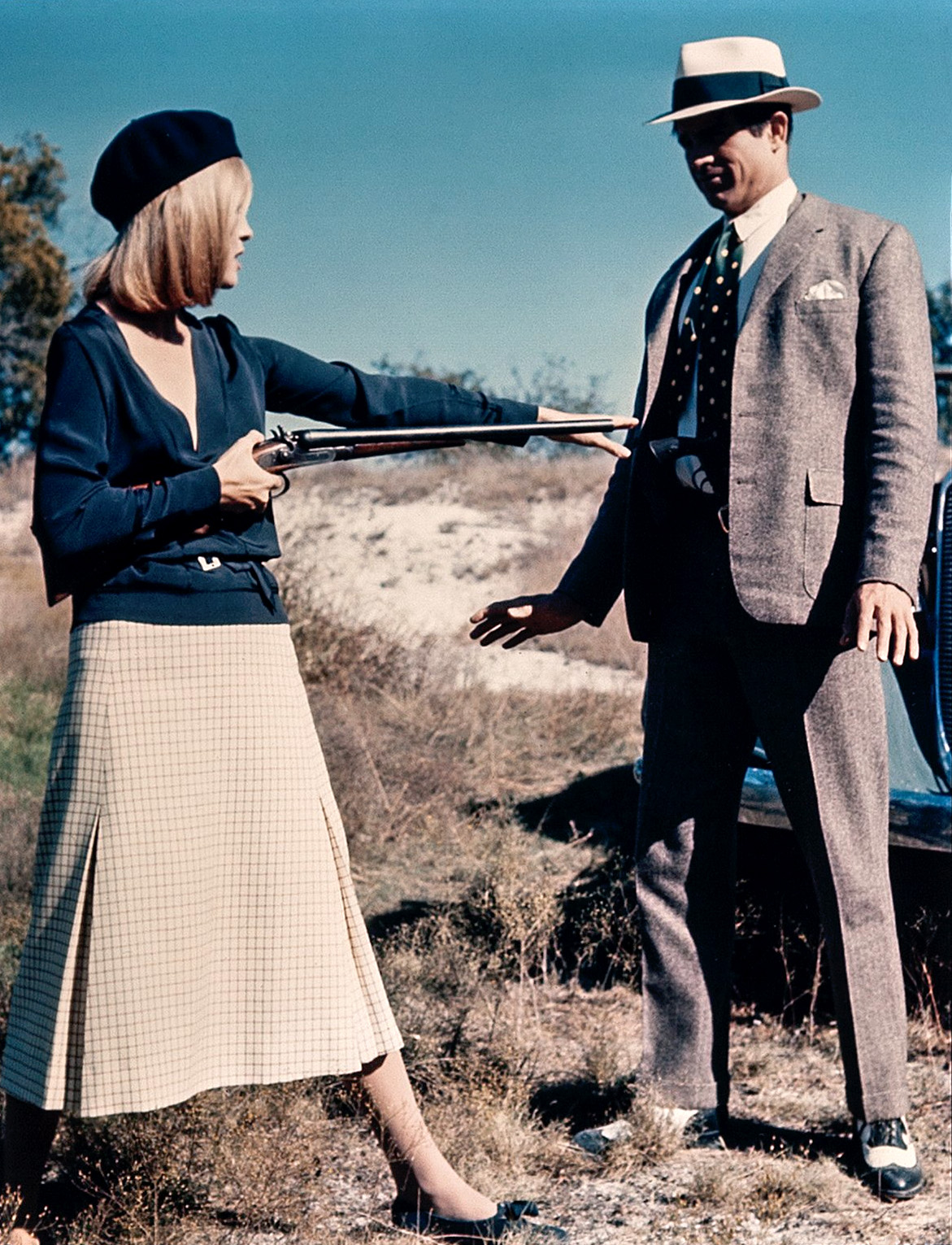
Promo photo of Warren Beatty and Faye Dunaway as the title characters in the 1967 film Bonnie and Clyde, often described as "pulp noir."

Pulp noir is a subgenre influenced by various "noir" genres, as well as pulp fiction genres; particularly the hard-boiled genres which help give rise to film noir. Pulp noir is marked by its use of classic noir techniques, but with urban influences. Various media include film, illustrations, photographs and videogames.

== In film ==
Whereas film noir directly involves characters living bleak existences to accomplish a goal with odds against them, pulp noir often portrays a grittier, one-man army. Typically, the main character has no distinguishing abilities, but can hold ground against seemingly impossible odds. Pulp noir locations are often seedy, run-down and degradated urban landscapes, where the lack of law, morals and even the proliferation of crime and drugs are common themes. Another common trend in pulp noir is the glorification and/or demonization of its urban locations.

== Examples ==
- Cat People (1942)
- Double Indemnity (1944)
- Laura (1944)
- Detour (1945)
- Hangover Square (1945)
- Gilda (1946)
- The Killers (1946)
- Nightmare Alley (1947)
- Out of the Past (1947)
- The Naked City (1948)
- Thieves Highway (1949)
- No Way Out (1950)
- Night and the City (1950)
- The Big Heat (1953)
- Niagara (1953)
- 99 River Street (1953)
- Pickup on South Street (1953)
- Killer's Kiss (1955)
- Kiss Me Deadly (1955)
- Touch of Evil (1958)
- The Crimson Kimono (1959)
- Shock Corridor (1963)
- Bonnie and Clyde (1967)
- Batman (1989)
- Dick Tracy (1990)
- The Rocketeer (1991)
- Pulp Fiction (1994)
- Million Dollar Baby (2004)
- Sin City (2005)
- The Paperboy (2012)
- The Wild Goose Lake (2019)

== In other media ==
Some illustrations and photographs are described as being pulp noir. Recently, some video games, such as the Max Payne third-person shooter series, have been portrayed in a film noir style, using heavy, gritty, dirty urban themes. SF Weekly journalist Matt Smith used the term to describe the act of "sprinting to the crime scene, skidding on my heels, and yelling at everyone and nobody in particular: 'Who's in charge here?'"

== See also ==
- Neo-noir
- Pulp magazines
- Vulgar auteurism
- Arthouse action film
- B-movie
