= Kalamos (disambiguation) =

Kalamos is a figure in Greek mythology.

Kalamos may also refer to:

- Kalamos (Thrace), a town of ancient Thrace, now in Turkey
- places in Greece:
  - Kalamos (island), a small island in the Ionian Sea, Lefkada regional unit
  - Kalamos, Attica, municipality north of Athens, Greece
  - Kalamos, Kythira, a village on the island of Kythira

== See also ==
- Calamus (disambiguation)
