= Keramoto =

Keramoto Κεραμωτό
- Settlement
- Location within Greece
- Coordinates: 36°12′0″N 22°58′22″E
- Country: Greece
- Administrative region: Attica
- Regional unit: Islands
- Municipality: Kythira
- Municipal unit: Kythira
- Community: Karvounades

Population (2021)
  - Total: 35
- Time zone: UTC+2 (EET)
  - Summer (DST): UTC+3 (EEST)

Keramoto is a settlement in the Greek island of Kythira. Administratively, it belongs to the Kythira Municipality of the Islands Regional Unit. It is part of the community of Karvounades. Some former inhabitants of Keramoto emigrated to Australia.

== Population ==
Historical population
Year	Pop.	±%
1991	18	—
2001	28	+55.6%
2011	38	+35.7%
2021	35	−7.9%

== Gallery ==
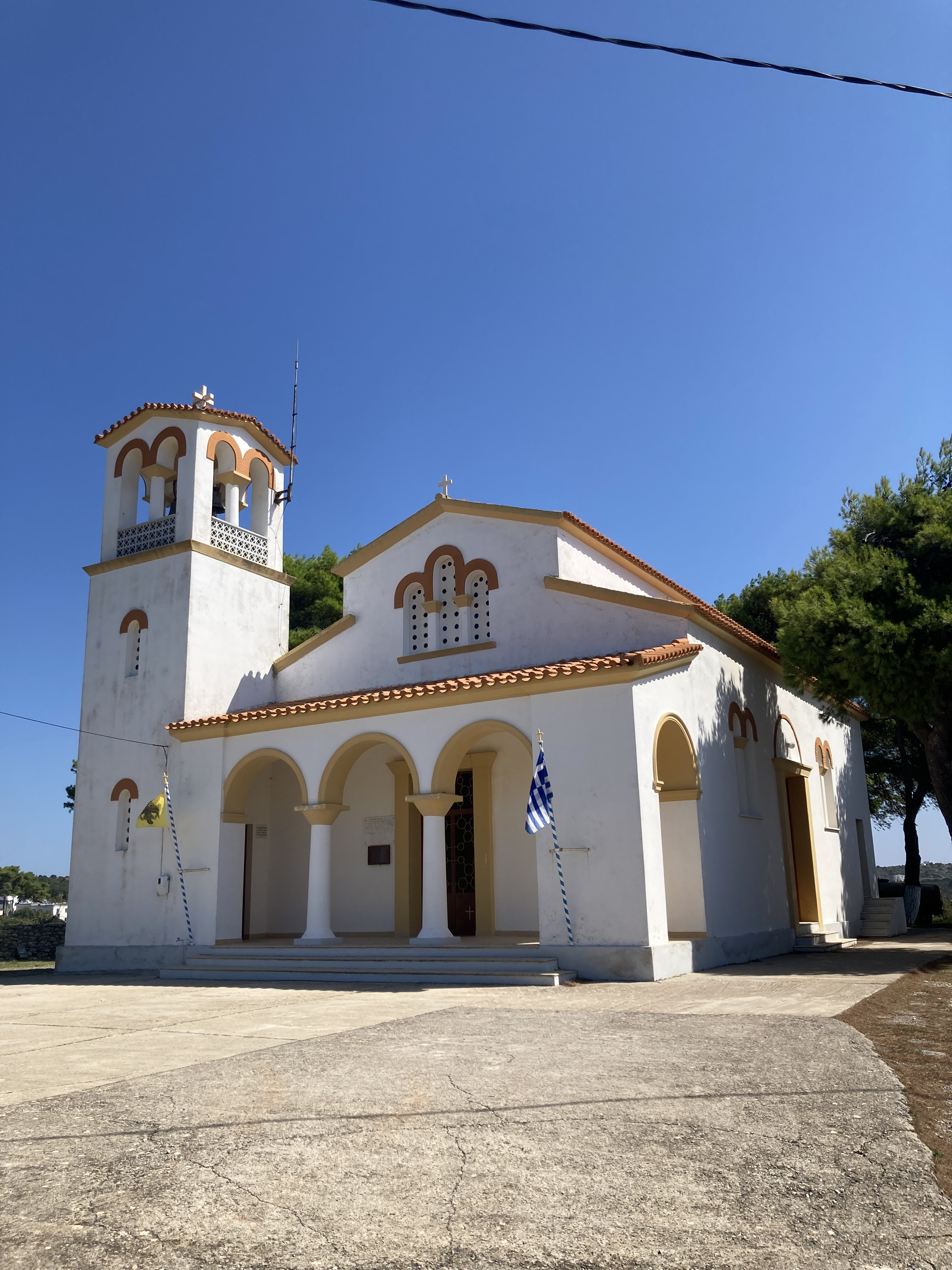
The Church the Savior in Keramoto.

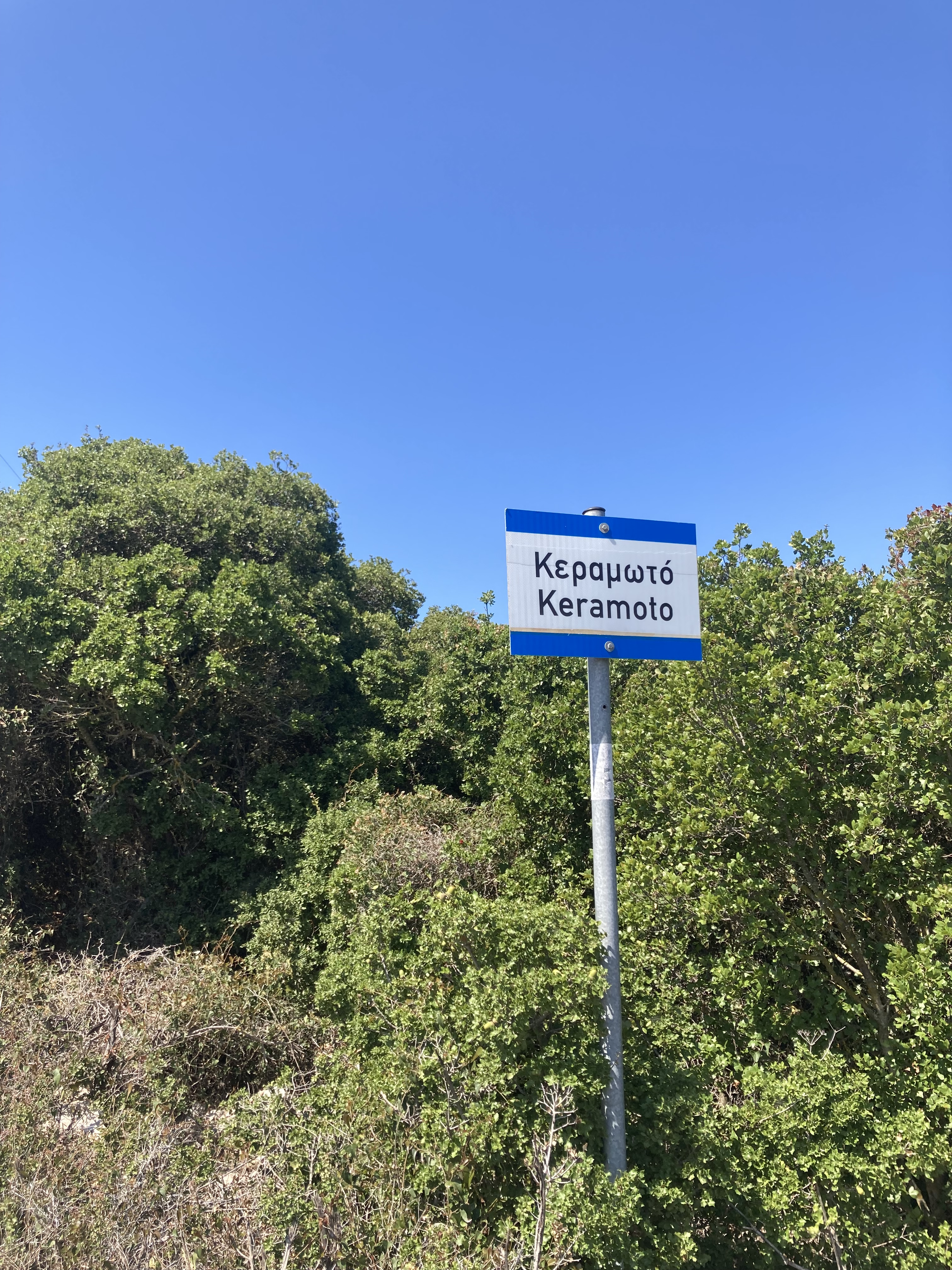
Keramoto's sign.

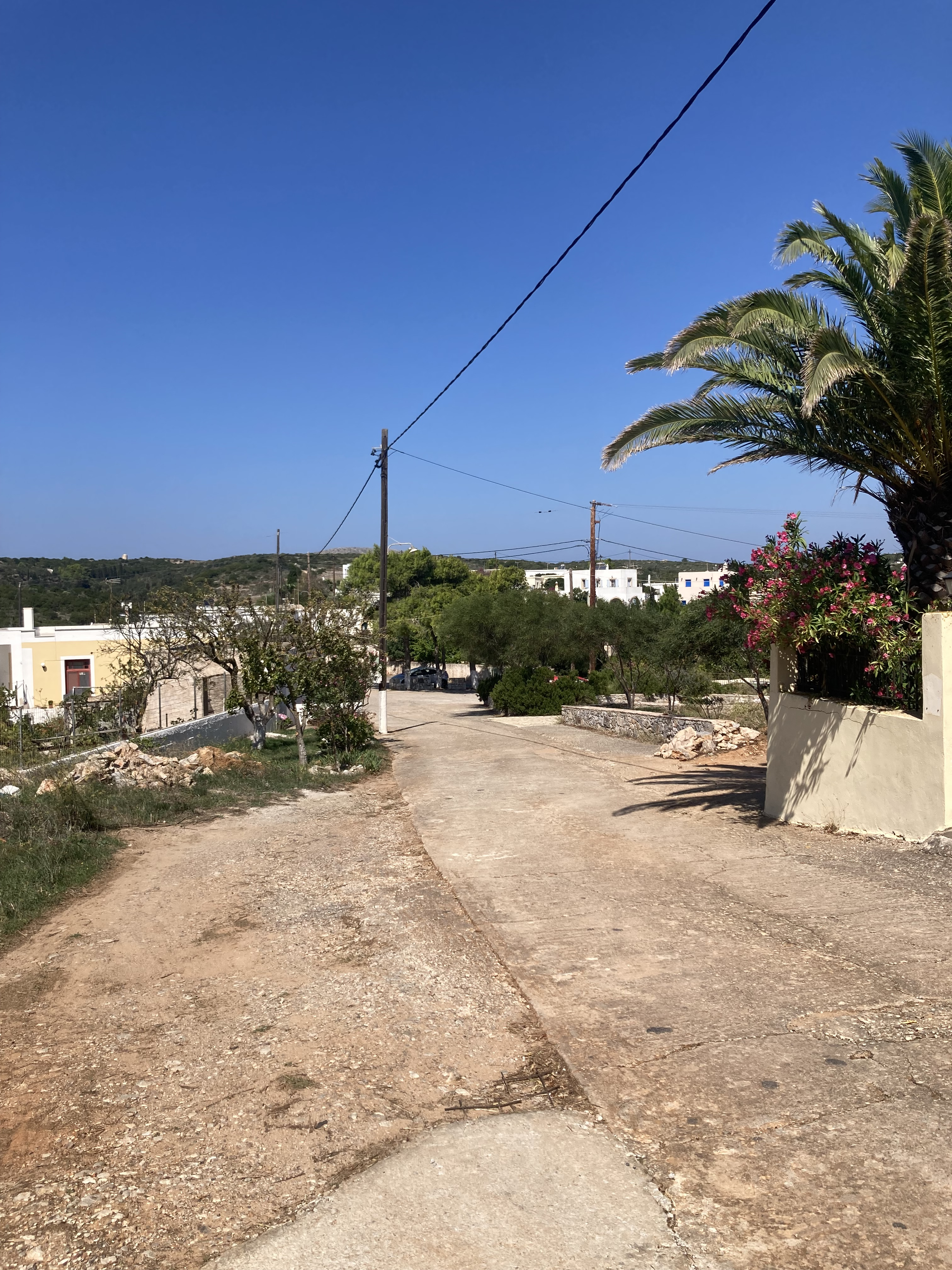
A street in Keramoto.

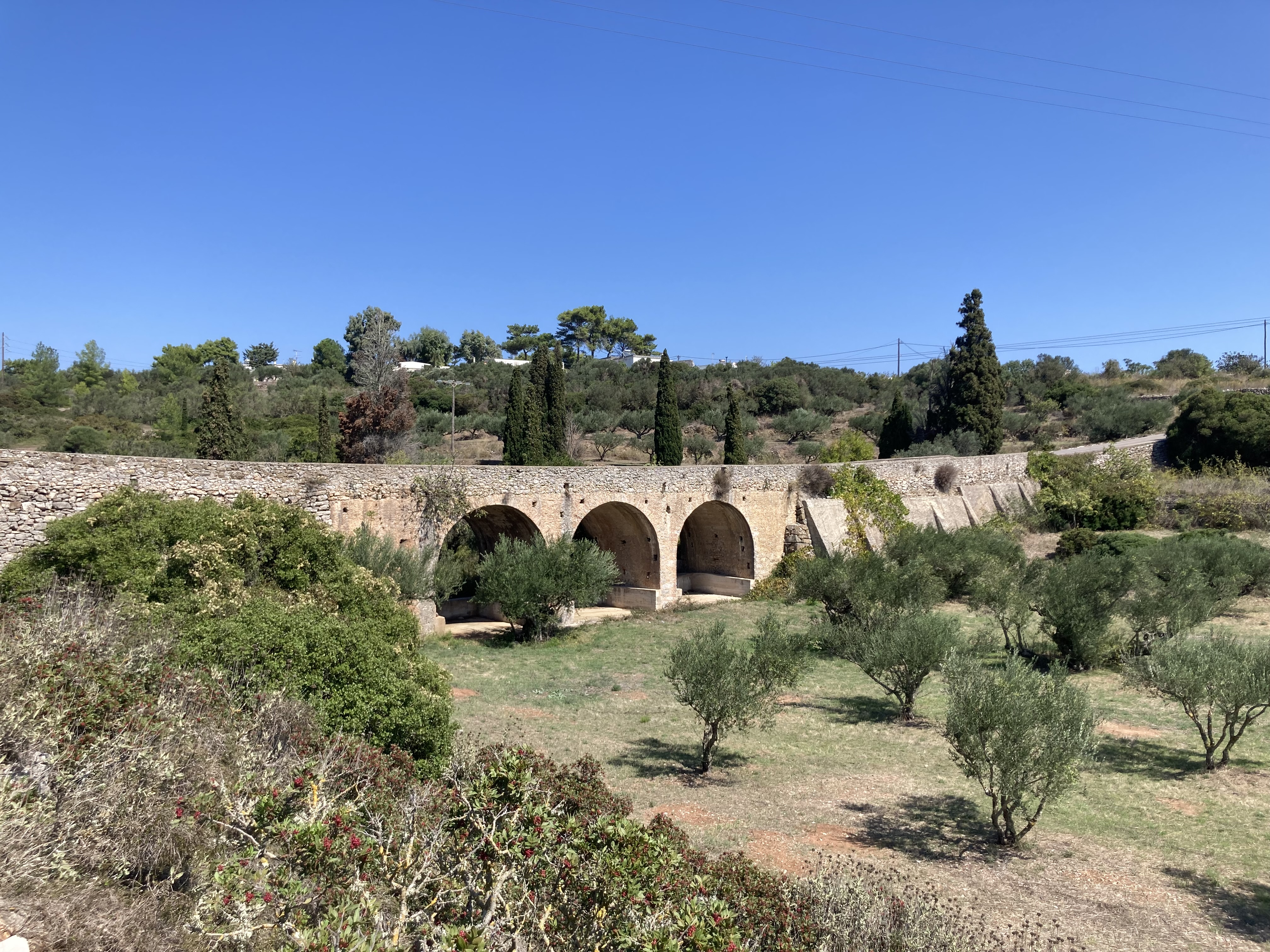
The bridge to Keramoto.

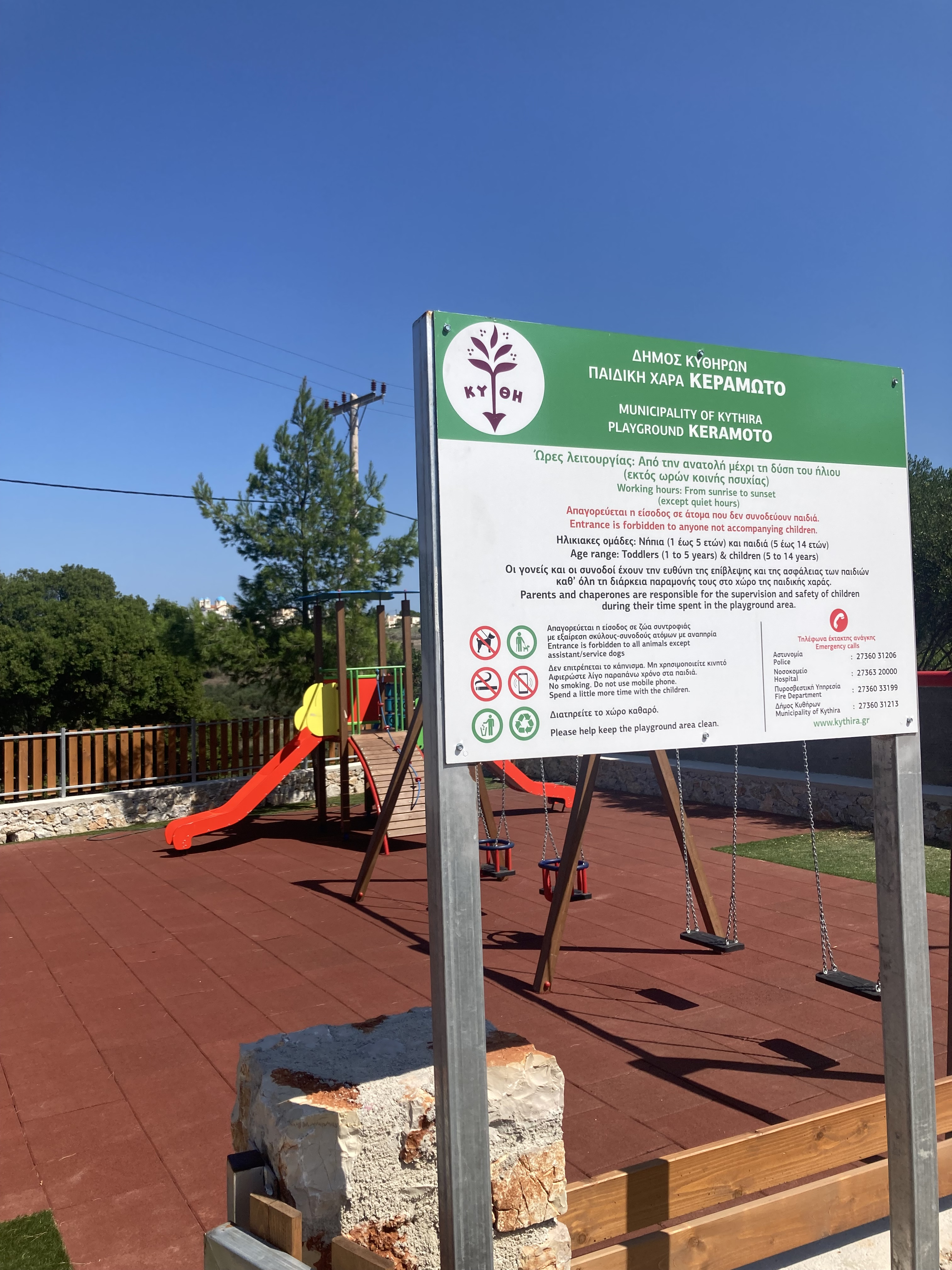
Keramoto's playground.

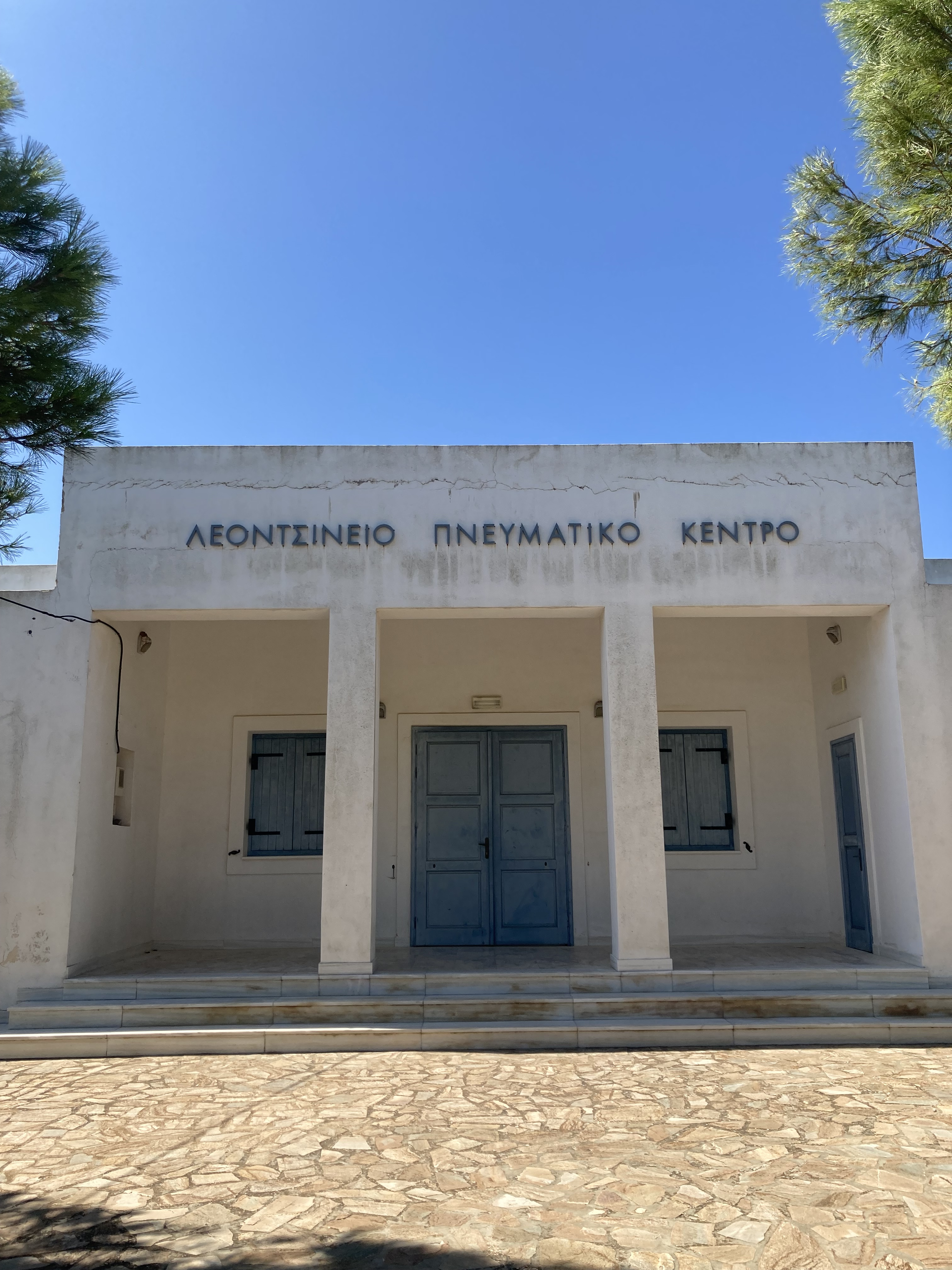
The Leontsinion Intellectual Center.
