= Alexandrades, Kythira =

Settlement in Kythira, Greece

Alexandrades Αλεξανδράδες
- Settlement
- Location within Greece
- Coordinates: 36°12′06″N 22°59′52″E
- Country: Greece
- Administrative region: Attica
- Regional unit: Islands
- Municipality: Kythira
- Municipal unit: Kythira
- Community: Karvounades

Population (2021)
  - Total: 42
- Time zone: UTC+2 (EET)
  - Summer (DST): UTC+3 (EEST)
- Postal code: 80100

Alexandrades (Greek: Αλεξανδράδες) is a settlement in the Greek island of Kythira. According to the 2021 Greek census, it had 42 residents.

== History ==
Although it is uncertain when Alexandrades was first inhabited, there is substantial proof it has been since at least the 14th century. According to archaeological research that has been conducted, there was an old cemetery within the settlement, that indicated it has been inhabited for a long time.

Alexandrades was first mentioned by its modern name in the 16th century, as well as in numerous contracts dating back to 1565. Additionally, Alexandrades was mentioned in some of the uncompleted works in Petros Kastrofylakas' census from 1583.

During the 18th century, the Goudianika (Γουδιάνικα) settlement was often referred to as Alexandrades as well.

It is assumed that Alexandrades had a bigger population in earlier years, since on the 1715 Ottoman census, it was divided into 4 parishes, those being St. Ioannou, St. Georgiou, St. Triados and St. Leou. Archistratigos parish was also considered part of Alexandrades during the 18th century. In the Venetian censuses, among other sources, the Kamaria district is mentioned, which was a parish of St. Georgios. In the past, not only did Alexandrades have a bigger population, but it also took up more land.

== Name ==
It is unsure where the name Alexandrades (Αλεξανδράδες) derives from.

It is quite rare for Kythirian location names to end with -άδες.

During the 16th century, there was at least 1 person whose surname was Alexandris (Αλεξανδρής) in Alexandrades, after whom the settlement could have possibly been named. This was the only found reference to this specific surname in the area, leading to the assumption that this was either one of the last references to the surname in question, or that references to it are generally scarce.

== Geography ==
Alexandrades is located in Kythira, an Ionian Island, and belongs to the Islands regional unit. It has an altitude of 330 metres.

== Population ==
Historical population
Year	Pop.	±%
1896	141	—
1991	25	−82.3%
2001	25	+0.0%
2011	35	+40.0%
2021	42	+20.0%
