= Kalamos, Kythira =

Coordinates: 36°09′30″N 23°01′43″E

Kalamos is a village in the south east side of Kythira, a Greek island in the Ionian Sea.

Kalamos has 174 inhabitants (2021), one church and three beaches nearby: Chalkos, Broulea and Fyrri Ammos.

Kalamos' protector saint is Saint Nikitas and Kalamites have built a church to his name. The memory of Saint Nikitas is celebrated on 16 September and a festival is held that day. In Kalamos there are \rooms to let, two cafés and a tavern with local meals. There is also a mini market.
