= Kalamos (Thrace) =

Town of ancient Thrace

Coordinates: 41°03′24″N 29°02′01″E

Kalamos was a town of ancient Thrace on the Bosphorus, inhabited during Roman times.

Its site is located south of Kuruçeşme in European Turkey.
