= Arvanites =

Albanian-speakers in Greece

Arvanites Αρbε̱ρεσ̈ε̰, Arbëreshë Αρβανίτες, Arvanítes
Total population
- est. 50,000–200,000 (see below)

Regions with significant populations
- Attica, Peloponnese, Boeotia, Euboea

Languages
- Albanian (Arvanitika), Greek

Religion
- Greek Orthodox

Related ethnic groups
- Albanians, Arbëreshë, Greeks

Arvanites (/ˈɑːrvənaɪts/; Arvanitika Albanian: Αρbε̱ρεσ̈ε̰, romanized: Arbëreshë or Arvanitika Albanian: Αρbε̰ρορε̱, romanized: Arbërorë; Greek: Αρβανίτες, romanized: Arvanítes) are a population group in Greece of Albanian origin. For many centuries the Arvanites regarded themselves and were regarded by Greeks as a distinct ethnic community. Their important role in the Greek War of Independence and the common Christian Orthodox religion they shared with the rest of the Greek-speaking population, led to them being regarded as an integral part of the Greek nation in the 19th century and they were exposed to increasing assimilation by the modern Greek state.

During the 20th century, Arvanites in Greece began to dissociate themselves much more strongly from the Albanians, stressing instead their national self-identification as Greeks. The Greek government pursued policies that actively discouraged the use of Arvanitika, and today, almost all Arvanites self-identify as Greeks and do not consider themselves Albanian. Nowadays, they are bilingual, traditionally speaking Arvanitika – an Albanian variety – along with Greek. Arvanitika is currently in a state of attrition due to a language shift towards Greek, the large-scale internal migration to the cities, and the subsequent intermingling of the Arvanite community with the wider Greek population during the 20th century onwards.

Albanians were first recorded as settlers who came to what is today southern Greece in the late 13th and early 14th century, with the last old migratory wave occurring in the second half of the 18th century. They were the dominant population element in parts of the Peloponnese, Attica, and Boeotia up until the 19th century. After settling in Greece, numerous groups from these Albanian communities began to migrate to Italy during the 15th–16th centuries, and now form part of the Arbëreshë community.

== Names ==
The name Arvanites and its equivalents are today used both in Greek (Αρβανίτες, singular form Αρβανίτης, feminine Αρβανίτισσα) and in Arvanitika itself (Arbëreshë or Arbërorë). In Standard Albanian (Arvanitë, Arbëreshë, Arbërorë) all three names are used. The name Arvanites and its variants are based upon the root arb/alb of the old ethnonym that was at one time used by all Albanians to refer to themselves. It refers to a geographical term, first attested in Polybius in the form of a place-name Arvon (Άρβων), and then again in Byzantine authors of the 11th and 12th centuries in the form Arvanon (Άρβανον) or Arvana (Άρβανα), referring to a place in what is today Albania. The name Arvanites ("Arbanitai") originally referred to the inhabitants of that region, and then to all Albanian-speakers. The alternative name Albanians may ultimately be etymologically related, but is of less clear origin (see Albania (toponym)). It was probably conflated with that of the "Arbanitai" at some stage due to phonological similarity. In later Byzantine usage, the terms "Arbanitai" and "Albanoi", with a range of variants, were used interchangeably, while sometimes the same groups were also called by the classicising names Illyrians. In the 19th and early 20th century, Alvani (Albanians) was used predominantly in formal registers and Arvanites (Αρβανίτες) in the more popular speech in Greek, but both were used indiscriminately for both Muslim and Christian Albanophones inside and outside Greece. In Albania itself, the self-designation Arvanites had been exchanged for the new name Shqiptarë since the 15th century, an innovation that was not shared by the Albanophone migrant communities in the south of Greece. In the course of the 20th century, it became customary to use only Αλβανοί for the people of Albania, and only Αρβανίτες for the Greek-Arvanites, thus stressing the national separation between the two groups.

There is some uncertainty to what extent the term Arvanites also includes the small remaining Christian Albanophone population groups in Epirus and West Macedonia. Unlike the southern Arvanites, these speakers are reported to use the name Shqiptarë both for themselves and for Albanian nationals, although these communities also espouse a Greek national identity nowadays. The word Shqiptár is also used in a few villages of Thrace, where Arvanites migrated from the mountains of Pindus during the 19th century. However they also use the name Arvanitis speaking in Greek. In Epirus the designation Chams is today rejected by Albanian speakers. The report by GHM (1995) subsumes the Epirote Albanophones under the term Arvanites, although it notes the different linguistic self-designation, on the other hand, applies the term Arvanites only to the populations of the compact Arvanitic settlement areas in southern Greece, in keeping with the self-identification of those groups. Linguistically, the Ethnologue identifies the present-day Albanian/Arvanitic dialects of Northwestern Greece (in Epirus and Lechovo) with those of the Chams, and therefore classifies them together with standard Tosk Albanian, as opposed to "Arvanitika Albanian proper" (i.e. southern Greek-Arvanitika). Nevertheless, it reports that in Greek the Epirus varieties are also often subsumed under "Arvanitika" in a wider sense. It puts the estimated number of Epirus Albanophones at 10,000. Arvanitika proper is said to include the outlying dialects spoken in Thrace.

== History ==
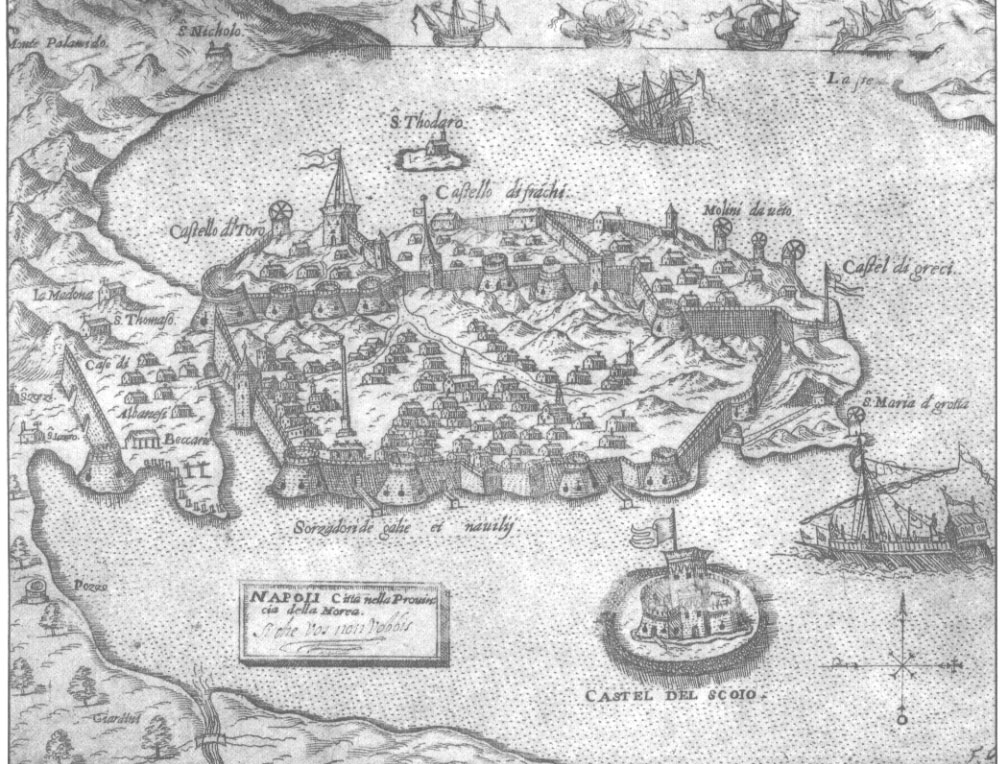
The Venetian walled city of Napoli di Romania where the Case di Albanesi (lit. Houses of the Albanians) can be seen outside the walls and the castles of their neighbouring communities Castel di Greci (lit. Castle of the Greeks) and Castello di Franchi (lit. Castle of the Francs) can be seen within. Early 16th century.

Arvanites in Greece originate from Albanian settlers who moved south from areas in what is today southern Albania during the Middle Ages. These Albanian movements into Greece are recorded for the first time in the late 13th and early 14th century. The reasons for this migration are not entirely clear and may be manifold. In many instances the Albanians were invited by the Byzantine and Latin rulers of the time. They were employed to re-settle areas that had been largely depopulated through wars, epidemics, and other reasons, and they were employed as soldiers. Some later movements are also believed to have been motivated to evade Islamization after the Ottoman conquest.

Groups of Albanians moved into Thessaly as early as 1268, as mercenaries of Michael Doukas. The Albanian tribes of Bua, Malakasioi and Mazaraki were described as "unruly" nomads living in the mountains of Thessaly in the early 14th century in Emperor John VI Kantakouzenos' 'History'. They numbered approximately 12,000. Kantakouzenos describes a pact they made to serve the Byzantine Emperor and pay tribute to him ca. 1332 in exchange for using the lowland areas of Thessaly in the summer months. Albanian groups were given military holdings Fanari in the 1330s and by the end of the 14th century and the Ottoman takeover of the region, they were an integral part of the military structures of Thessaly. Two of their military leaders known in Byzantine sources as Peter and John Sebastopoulos controlled the small towns of Pharsala and Domokos. Ottoman control began in the late 14th century with the capture of Larissa in 1392-93 and consolidated in the early 15th century. Nevertheless, Ottoman control was threatened throughout this era by groups of Greeks, Albanians and Vlachs who based themselves in the mountainous areas of Thessaly.

The main waves of migration into southern Greece started from 1350, reached a peak some time during the 14th century, and ended around 1600. Albanians first reached Thessaly, then Attica, and finally the Peloponnese. One of the larger groups of Albanian settlers, amounting to 10,000, settled the Peloponnese during the reign of Theodore I Palaiologos, first in Arcadia and subsequently in the more southern regions around Messenia, Argolis, Elis and Achaea. Around 1418, a second large group arrived, possibly fleeing Aetolia, Acarnania and Arta, where Albanian political power had been defeated. After the Ottoman incursion in 1417, other groups from Albania crossed western Greece and may have infiltrated into Achaea. The settled Albanians practiced a nomadic lifestyle based on pastoralism, and spread out into small villages.

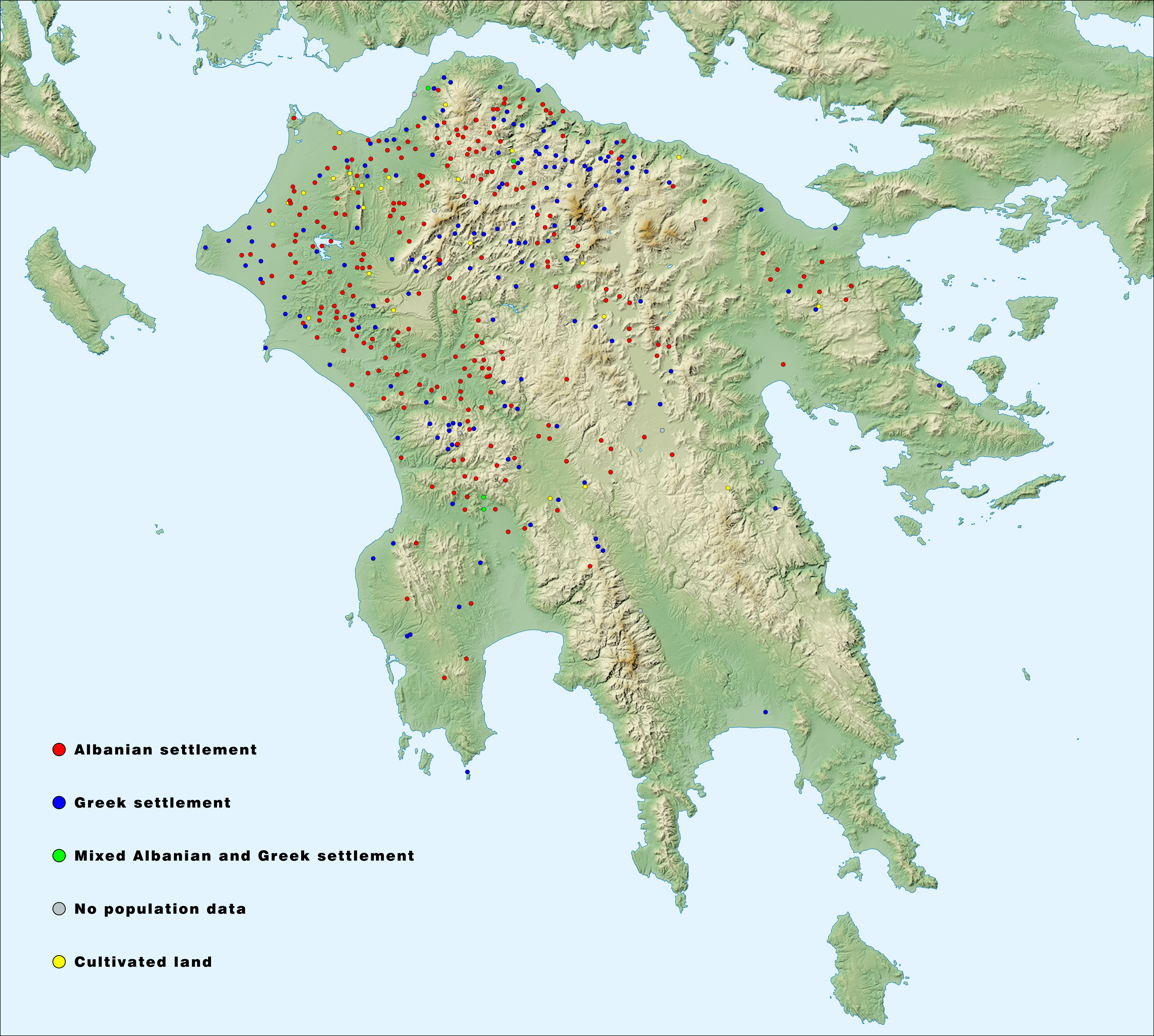
Identified Albanian settlements in the Peloponnese, according to the Ottoman taxation cadastre of 1460–1463. Many of these settlements have since been abandoned, while others have been renamed. Out of the 580 inhabited villages, 407 are listed as Albanian, 169 as Greek, and four as mixed; the average number of families residing in Albanian villages was 3.5 times smaller than that of the Greek ones.

In 1453, the Albanians rose in revolt against Thomas and Demetrios Palaiologos, due to the chronic insecurity and tribute payment to the Turks; they were also joined by the local Greeks, who by then had a common leader in Manuel Kantakouzenos. Following the Ottoman conquest, many Albanians fled to Italy and settled primarily in the Arbëreshë villages of Calabria and Sicily. On the other hand, in an effort to control the remaining Albanians, during the second half of the 15th century, the Ottomans adopted favorable tax policies towards them, likely in continuation of similar Byzantine practices. This policy had been discontinued by the early 16th century. Albanians often took part in wars on the side of the Republic of Venice against the Ottomans, between 1463 and 1715.

During the Greek War of Independence, many Arvanites played an important role on fighting on the Greek side against the Ottomans, often as national Greek heroes. With the formation of modern nations and nation-states in the Balkans, Arvanites have come to be regarded as an integral part of the Greek nation. In 1899, leading representatives of the Arvanites in Greece, including descendants of the independence heroes, published a manifesto calling their fellow Albanians outside Greece to join in the creation of a common Albanian-Greek state.

After the Greek War of Independence, Arvanites contributed greatly to the fulfilment of irredentist concept of Megali Idea which aimed to see all Greek populations in the Ottoman Empire freed and came to a halt with the end of the Greco-Turkish war in 1922. Up to the early 20th century, Albanian, in the form of the Arvanitika dialect, was the main language of the Greek naval fleet, because a high proportion of its sailors came from Albanian-speaking islands of Greece. For example, in Hydra men spoke both Albanian and Greek, with the former used to speak with each other and sing songs in the sea. Many women though spoke only Albanian.

In the small 19th-century Kingdom of Greece, and specifically in c. 1854–1861, it is estimated that around 16–25% of the population was Albanian (Arvanite); in c. 1879, after the incorporation of the Ionian Islands, it is estimated that it was about 11.3% of the population. That population spoke Albanian as its mother language, even in the absence of Albanian schools and alphabet, as the state discouraged any expression of Albanian national identity and nationalism. Although the Albanian speakers were considered Greeks, which they were not, there was a glimpse of Albanianism as expressed by some intellectuals such as Tasos Neroutsos, Anastas Kullurioti, Anastas Byku and Panayotis Koupitoris.

During the 20th century, after the creation of the Albanian nation-state, Arvanites in Greece have come to dissociate themselves much more strongly from the Albanians, stressing instead their national self-identification as Greeks. At the same time, it has been suggested that many Arvanites in earlier decades maintained an assimilatory stance, leading to a progressive loss of their traditional language and a shifting of the younger generation towards Greek.

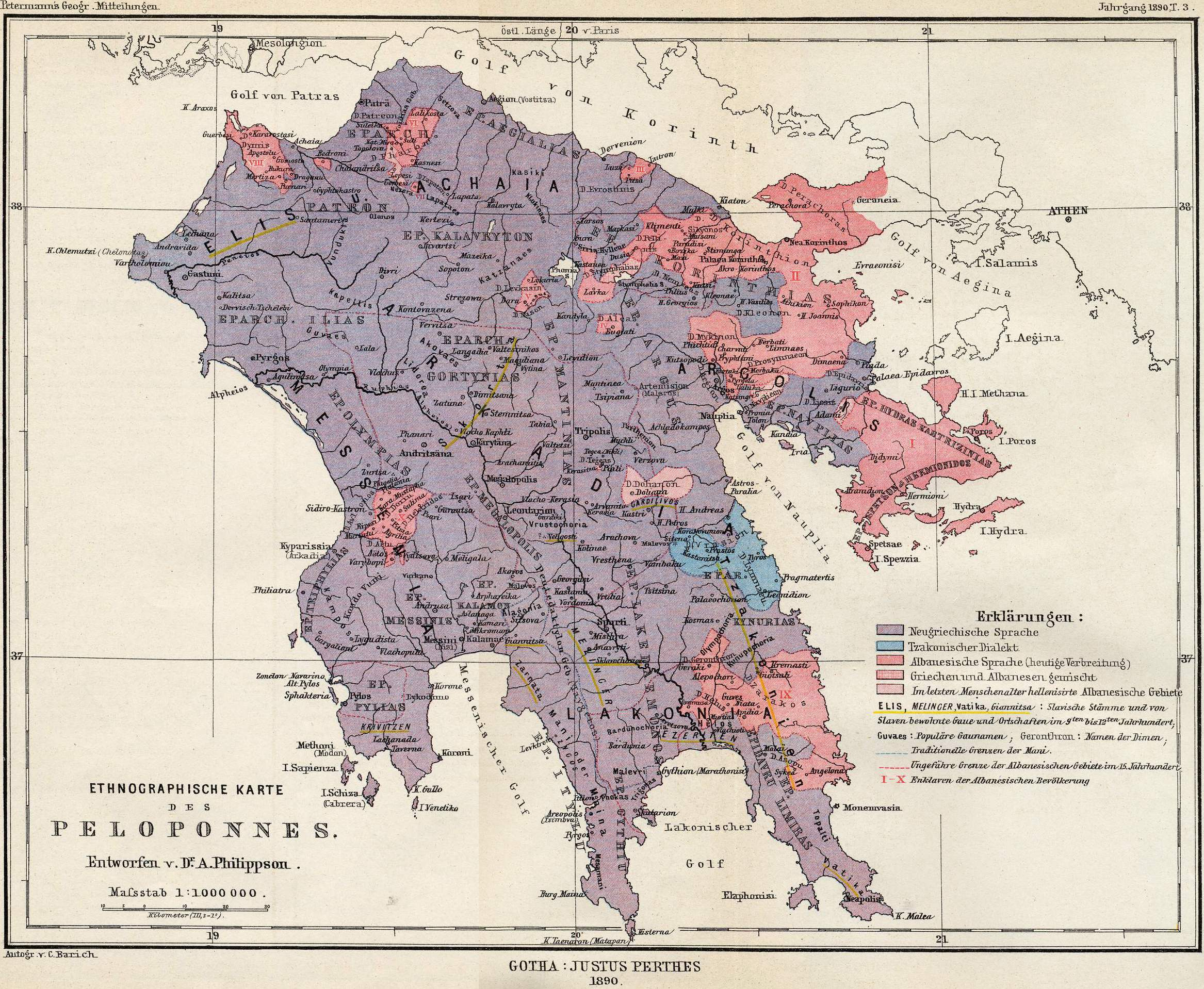
Alfred Philippson's ethnographic map of the Peloponnese, 1890; Albanian-speaking areas in red.

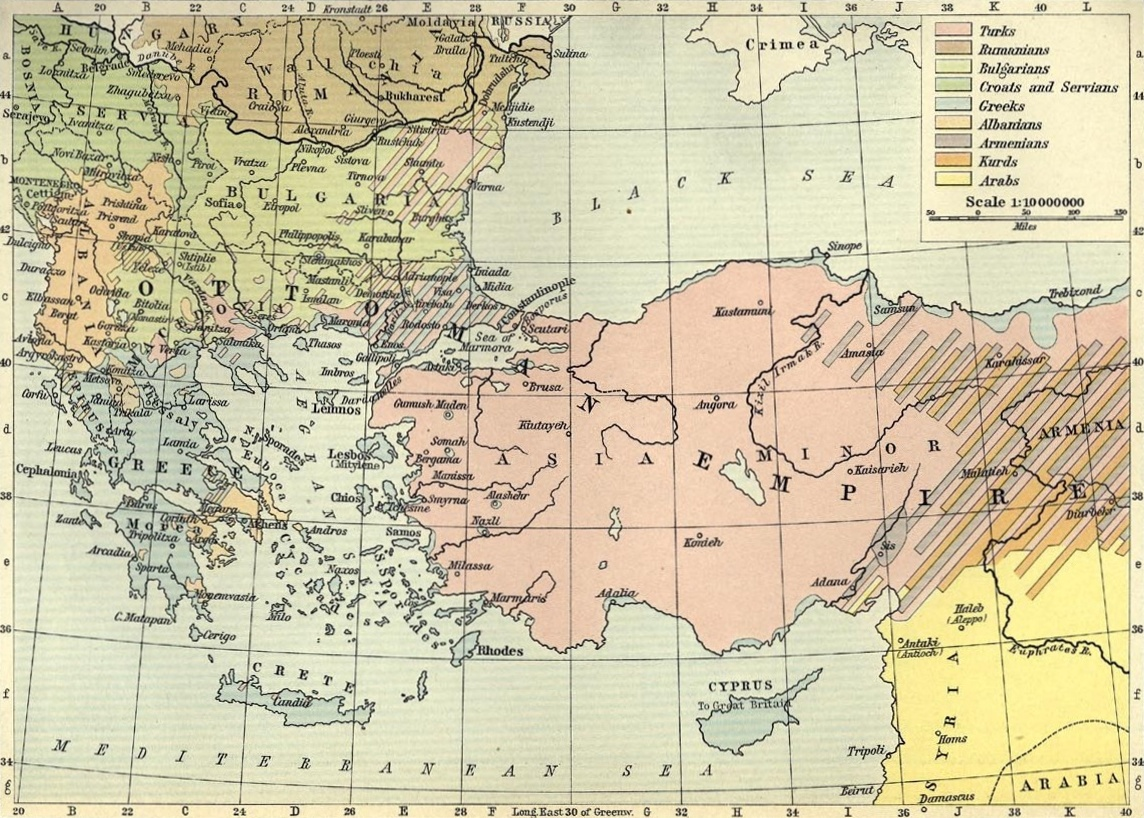
American ethnographic map of the Balkan Peninsula, 1911; Albanian-inhabited areas in light orange.

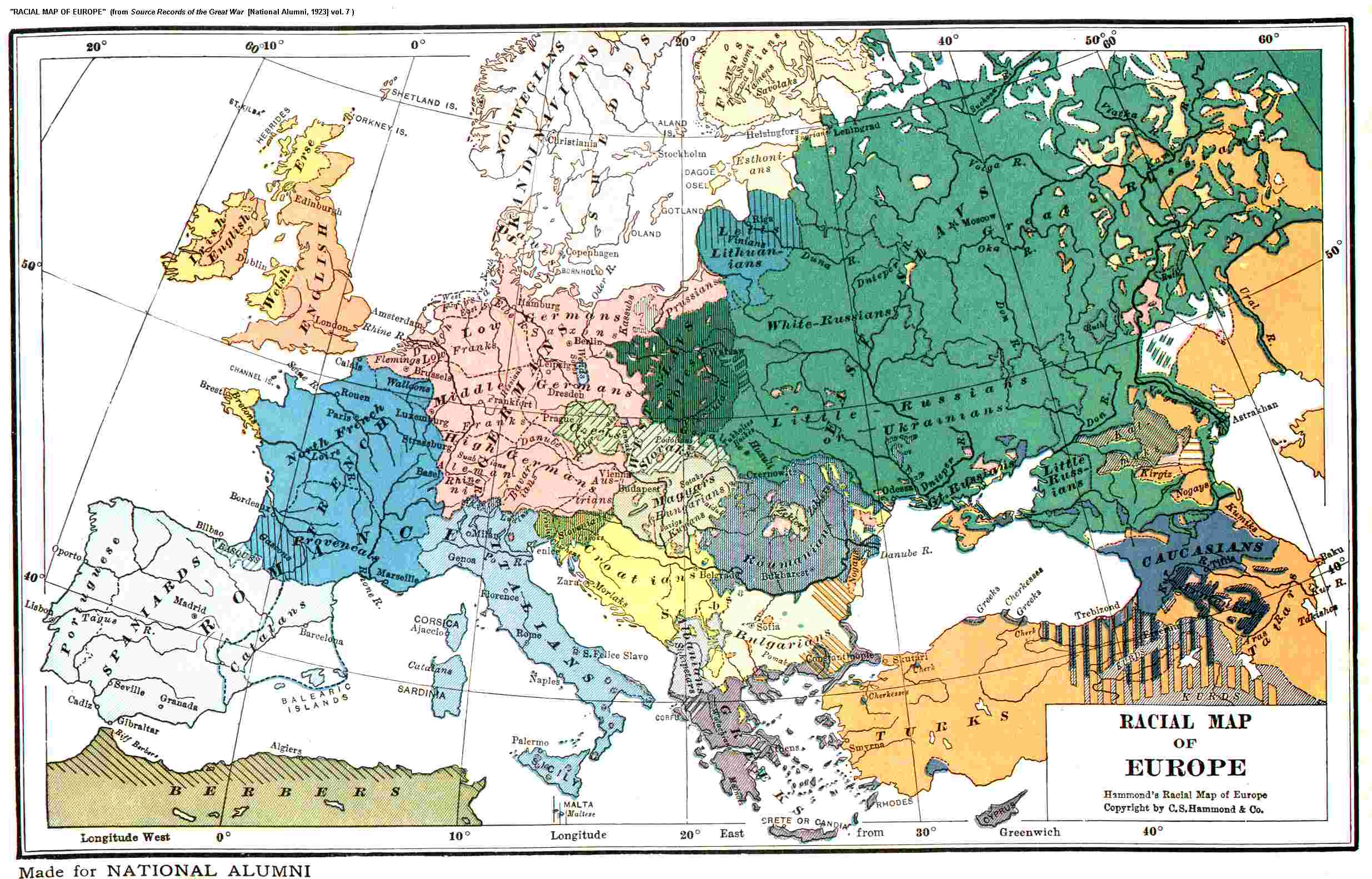
Albanians in Greece (light blue shade), 1923 (C.S. Hammond & Co)

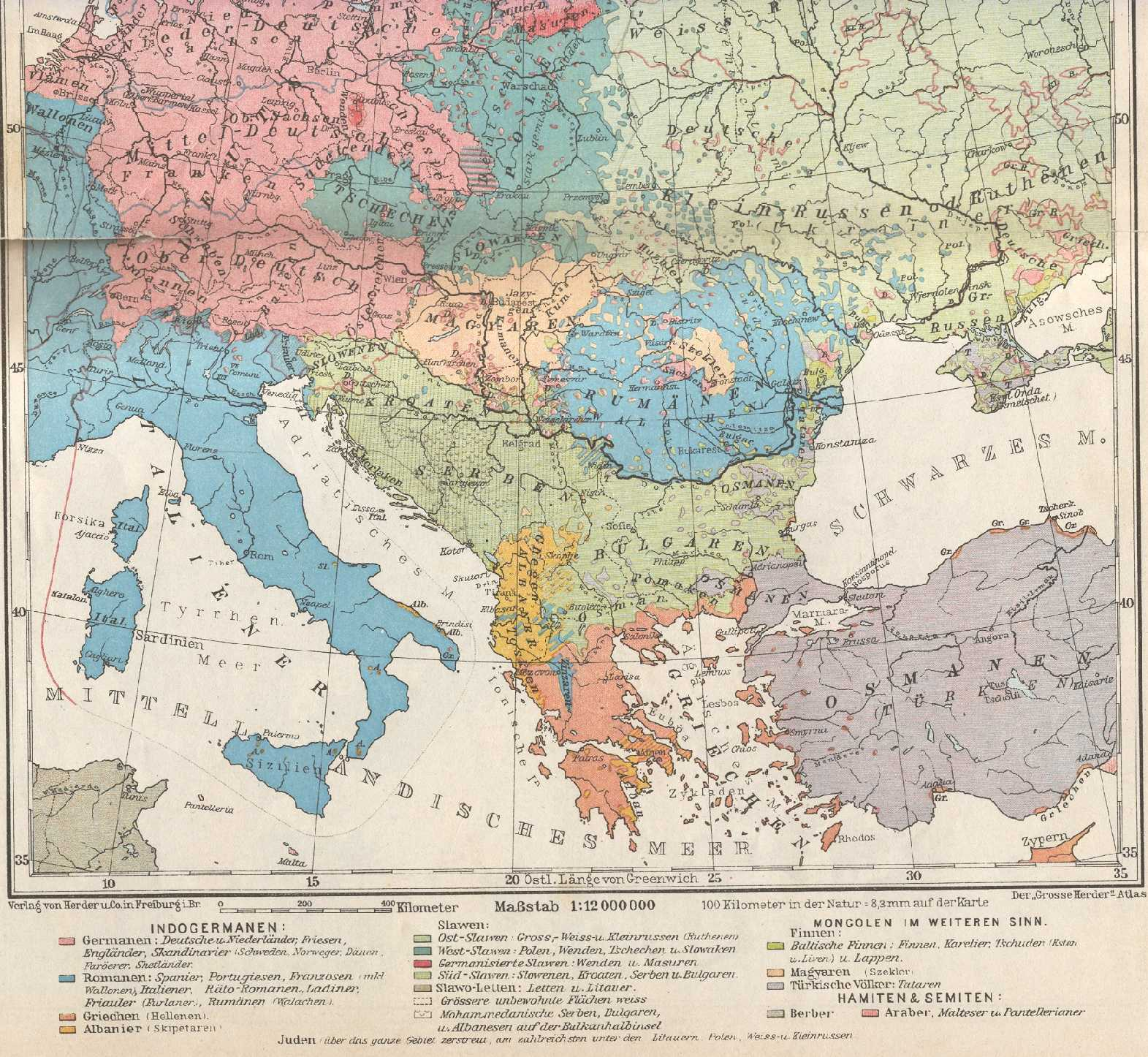
Albanians in Greece (orange shade), 1932 (Carl Troll)

At some times, particularly under the nationalist 4th of August Regime under Ioannis Metaxas of 1936–1941, Greek state institutions followed a policy of actively discouraging and repressing the use of Arvanitika. The Arvanitika-speaking communities in the Athens area came under greater pressure, as their presence was seen as damaging the purity of the ethnic heritage. The Arvanites were persecuted by the state in different ways. During World War II their position improved to some degree after members of the community helped other Greeks serving in the Albanian front. In the decades following World War II and the Greek Civil War, many Arvanites came under pressure to abandon Arvanitika in favour of monolingualism in the national language, and especially the archaizing Katharevousa which remained the official variant of Greek until 1976. This trend was prevalent especially during the Greek military junta of 1967–1974.

== Demographics ==
The 1460–1463 Ottoman taxation cadastre recorded the taxable population of the Peloponnese by households (ḫâne), bachelors, and widows. Specifically, there were 6,551 (58.37%) Greek and 4,672 (41.63%) Albanian households, 909 (66.25%) Greek and 463 (33.75%) Albanian bachelors, and 562 (72.05%) Greek and 218 (27.95%) Albanian widows. Greeks tended to live in large villages and cities, while Albanians in small villages. Specifically, out of the 580 inhabited villages, 407 are listed as Albanian, 169 as Greek, and four as mixed; however, Greek villages had on average 3.5 times more families than Albanian ones. Many of these settlements have since been abandoned, while others have been renamed. A Venetian source of the mid-15th century estimates that 30,000 Albanians lived in the Peloponnese at that time. Throughout the Ottoman–Venetian wars, many Albanians died or were captured in service to the Venetians; at Nafpaktos, Nafplio, Argos, Methoni, Koroni and Pylos. Furthermore, 8,000 Albanian stratioti, most of them along with their families, left the Peloponnese to continue their military service under the Republic of Venice or the Kingdom of Naples.

Historian Thomas Gordon who traveled in the Kingdom of Greece in the 1830s and earlier in the 1820s described its Albanian-speaking areas: "Attica, Argolis, Boeotia, Phocis, and the isles of Hydra, Spetses, Salamis, and Andros" as well as "several villages in Arcadia, Achaia, and Messenia". In the mid-19th century, Johann Georg von Hahn estimated the number of Albanians (Arvanites) throughout Greece to be 173,000, while historian George Finlay, estimated they numbered about 200,000 out of approximately 1.1 million inhabitants in total based on the 1861 census. A demographic census by Alfred Philippson, based on fieldwork between 1887 and 1889, found that out of the approximately 730,000 inhabitants of the Peloponnese, and the three neighboring islands of Poros, Hydra and Spetses, Arvanites numbered 90,253, or 12.3% of the total population. According to the Greek census of 1907, Albanian-speakers numbered 50,975 out of 2,631,952 population in total. The results of that census are unreliable, and were questioned by those responsible for it. With few exceptions, the official census data that have been published since 1907 were manipulated by the Greek state, misrepresenting the reality or avoiding to deal with ethno-linguistic diversity.

There are no official figures about the number of Arvanites in Greece today (no official data exist for ethnicity in Greece). The last official census figures available come from 1951. Since then, estimates of the numbers of Arvanites has ranged from 25,000 to 200,000. The following is a summary of the widely diverging estimates (Botsi 2003: 97):

- 1928 census: 18,773 citizens self-identifying as "Albanophone" in all of Greece.
- 1951 census: 22,736 "Albanophones".
- Furikis (1934): estimated 70,000 Arvanites in Attica alone.
- Trudgill/Tzavaras (1976/77): estimated 140,000 in Attica and Boeotia together.
- Sasse (1991): estimated 50,000 Arvanitika speakers in all of Greece.
- Ethnologue, 2000: 150,000 Arvanites, living in 300 villages.
- Federal Union of European Nationalities, 1991: 95,000 "Albanians of Greece" (MRG 1991: 189)
- Minority Rights Group International, 1997: 200,000 Arvanites of Greece.
- Jan Markusse (2001): 25.000 Arvanites in Greece

Like the rest of the Greek population, Arvanites have been emigrating from their villages to the cities and especially to the capital Athens. This has contributed to the loss of the language in the younger generation.

Today, regions with a strong traditional presence of Arvanites are found mainly in a compact area in southeastern mainland Greece, namely across Attica (especially in Eastern Attica), southern Boeotia, the north-east of the Peloponnese, the south of the island of Euboea, the north of the island of Andros, and several islands of the Saronic Gulf including Salamis, Hydra, Poros, Agistri and Spetses. In parts of this area they formed a solid majority until about 1900. Within Attica, parts of the capital Athens and its suburbs were Arvanitic until the late 19th century. There are also settlements in some other parts of the Peloponnese, and in Phthiotis. Albanians also settled on the islands of Kea, Psara, Aegina, Kythnos, Skopelos, Ios and Samos. They would thereafter assimilate into the Greek population.

In the 1990s, the European Commission's Euromosaic Project documenting minority languages recorded the geographic distribution and language status of Arvanites and Arvanitika in Greece.

Distribution of Arvanites in southern Greece (Euromosaic)
Administrative divisions	Geographic location and language status (late 20th century)
Attica (prefectures of Athens, East Attica, and West Attica)	In the early 20th century, apart from Megara and another smaller village, all villages in Attica and some neighbourhoods of Athens were Arvanite. The modern large population concentrated in Attica has altered the demographics of the area. Majority of villages have remained Arvanite.
Euboea	Excluding the towns of Aliveri and Karistos, all villages of the Karistos sub–prefecture below the Achladeri–Prinia line consisting of a large area in the southernmost part of the island.
Cyclades	Over 10 villages located in the northern part of Andros island.
Corinthia	70 villages, mostly in the eastern part of the prefecture.
Argolis	30–35 villages, most located east of Argos and in the Ermioni sub–prefecture.
Achaea	Under 20 villages, all located in the west, except one. Arvanitika no longer spoken in Mount Panachaiko area.
Messenia	20 villages in the sub–prefecture of Trifylia.
Arcadia	1 village.
Elis	Arvanitika ceased to be spoken by the 1940s.
Laconia	A few speakers remained among the elderly.
Piraeus	All villages in the sub–prefecture of Troezen, the islands of Salamis, Agistri, Hydra, and Spetses.
Boeotia	Over 60 villages, most located in the sub–prefecture of Thebes.
Phthiotis	6–7 villages in the southeastern part of the prefecture.

== Language use and language perception ==
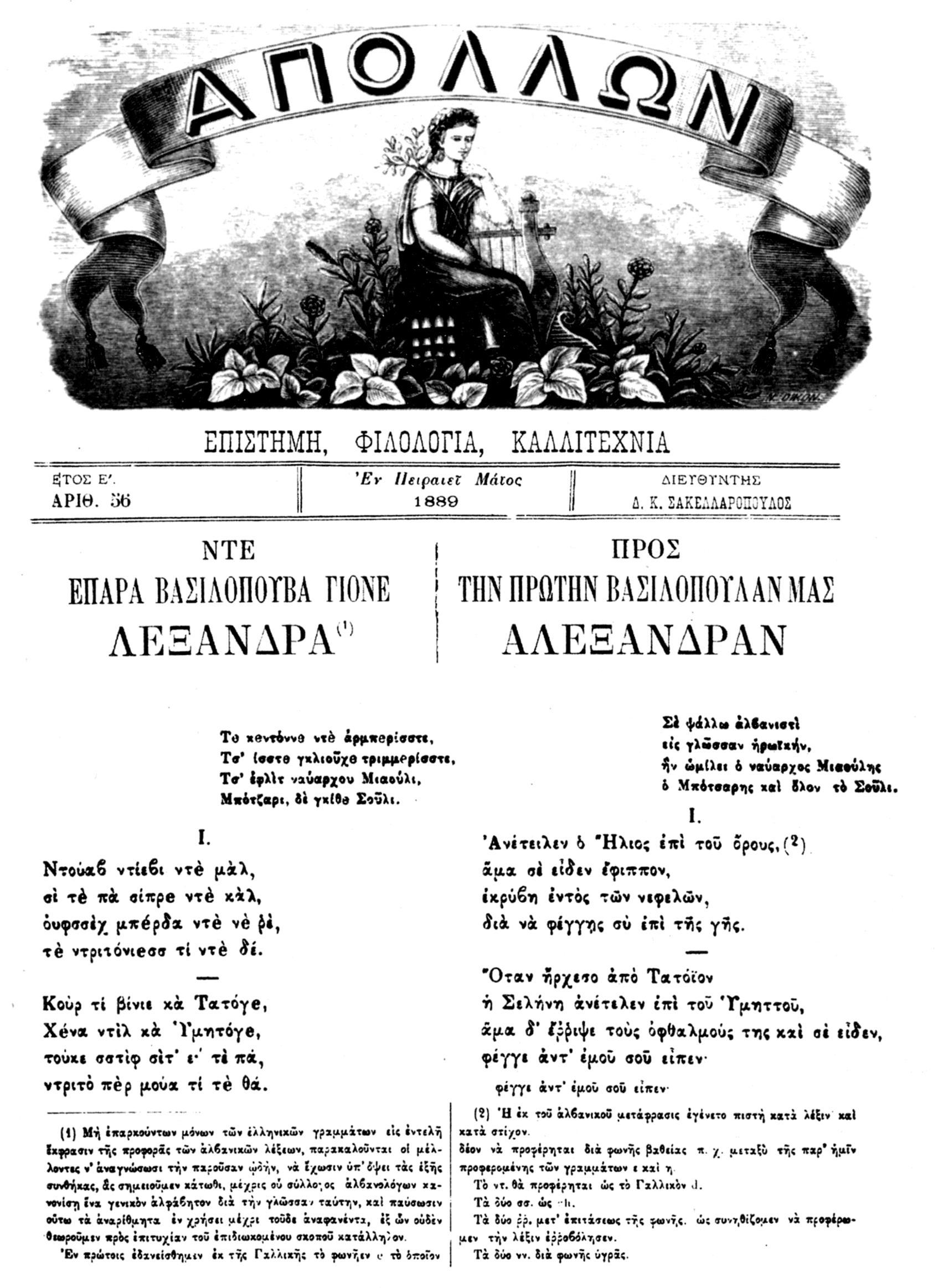
Opening verses of a poem composed in Arvanitika, with Greek translation, honoring the marriage between Alexandra and Archduke Paul of Russia; 1889.

Arvanitika is a dialect of the Albanian language, sharing similar features primarily with other Tosk varieties. The name Arvanítika and its native equivalent Arbërisht are derived from the ethnonym Arvanites, which in turn comes from the toponym Arbëna (Greek: Άρβανα), which in the Middle Ages referred to a region in what is today Albania. Its native equivalents (Arbërorë, Arbëreshë and others) used to be the self-designation of Albanians in general.

While Arvanitika was commonly called Albanian in Greece until the 20th century, the wish of Arvanites to express their ethnic identification as Greeks has led to a stance of rejecting the identification of the language with Albanian as well. In recent times, Arvanites had only very imprecise notions about how related or unrelated their language was to Albanian. Since Arvanitika is almost exclusively a spoken language, Arvanites also have no practical affiliation with the Standard Albanian language used in Albania, as they do not use this form in writing or in media. The question of linguistic closeness or distance between Arvanitika and Albanian has come to the forefront especially since the early 1990s, when a large number of Albanian immigrants began to enter Greece and came into contact with local Arvanitic communities.

Since the 1980s, there have been some organized efforts to preserve the cultural and linguistic heritage of Arvanites. The largest organisation promoting Arvanitika is the "Arvanitic League of Greece" (Αρβανίτικος Σύλλογος Ελλάδος).

Arvanitika is currently considered in danger of extinction due to it having no legal status in Greece. The language is also not available at any level of the educational system in Greece. Social changes, government policies, and public indifference have also contributed to the decline of the language.

== Intercommunity relations ==
Arvanites were regarded as ethnically distinct from the Greeks until the 19th century. Amongst the Arvanites, this difference was expressed in words such as shkljira for a Greek person and shkljerishtë for the Greek language that had until recent decades negative overtones. These words in Arvanitika have their related counterpart in the pejorative term shqa used by Northern Albanians for Slavs. Ultimately these terms used amongst Albanian speakers originate from the Latin word sclavus which contained the traditional meaning of "the neighbouring foreigner".

With participation in the Greek War of Independence and the Civil War, this has led to increasing assimilation amongst the Arvanites. The common Christian Orthodox religion they shared with the rest of the local population was one of the main reasons that led to their assimilation. Although sociological studies of Arvanite communities still used to note an identifiable sense of a special "ethnic" identity among Arvanites, the authors did not identify a sense of 'belonging to Albania or to the Albanian nation'. Many Arvanites find the designation "Albanians" offensive as they identify nationally and ethnically as Greeks and not Albanians. Jacques Lévy describes the Arvanites as "Albanian speakers who were integrated into Greek national identity as early as the first half of the nineteenth century and who in no way consider themselves as an ethnic minority".

Relations between Arvanites and other Albanian speaking populations have varied over time. During the onset of the Greek war of Independence, Arvanites fought alongside Greek revolutionaries and against Muslim Albanians. Arvanites participated in the 1821 Tripolitsa massacre while some Muslim Albanian speakers in the region of Bardounia remained after the war, converting to Orthodoxy. In recent times, Arvanites have expressed mixed opinions towards Albanian immigrants within Greece. Negative views are perceptions that Albanian immigrants are "communists" arriving from a "backward country", or an opportune people with questionable morals, behaviors and a disrespect for religion. Other Arvanites during the late 1980s and early 1990s expressed solidarity with Albanian immigrants, due to linguistic similarities and being politically leftist. Relations too between Arvanites and other Orthodox Albanian speaking communities such as those of Greek Epirus are mixed, as they are distrusted regarding religious matters due to a past Albanian Muslim population living amongst them.

Amongst the wider Greek speaking population however, the Arvanites and their language Arvanitika were viewed in past times in a derogatory manner. These views contributed toward shaping negative attitudes held by Arvanites regarding their language and thereby increasing assimilation. In post-dictatorial Greece, the Arvanites have rehabilitated themselves within Greek society through for example the propagation of the Pelasgian theory regarding Arvanite origins. The theory created a counter discourse that aimed to give the Arvanites a positive image in Greek history by claiming the Arvanites as the ancestors and relations of contemporary Greeks and their culture. The Arvanite revival of the Pelasgian theory has also been recently borrowed by other Albanian speaking populations within and from Albania in Greece to counter the negative image of their communities. However, this theory has been rejected by modern scholars and it is seen as a myth.

In the 1990s, the Albanian president Sali Berisha raised a question about an Albanian minority in Greece, but the Arvanite cultural associations reacted angrily to his statement.

== Arvanitic culture ==
=== Fara ===
Fara (Greek: φάρα, means "seed", "descendants" in Albanian, from Proto-Albanian *pʰarā) is a descent model, similar to the Albanian tribal system of fis. Arvanites were organised in phares (φάρες) mostly during the reign of the Ottoman Empire. The apical ancestor was a warlord and the phara was named after him. In an Arvanitic village, each phara was responsible to keep genealogical records (see also registry offices), that are preserved until today as historical documents in local libraries. Usually, there were more than one phares in an Arvanitic village and sometimes they were organised in phratries that had conflicts of interest. Those phratries didn't last long, because each leader of a phara desired to be the leader of the phratry and would not be led by another.

=== Role of women ===
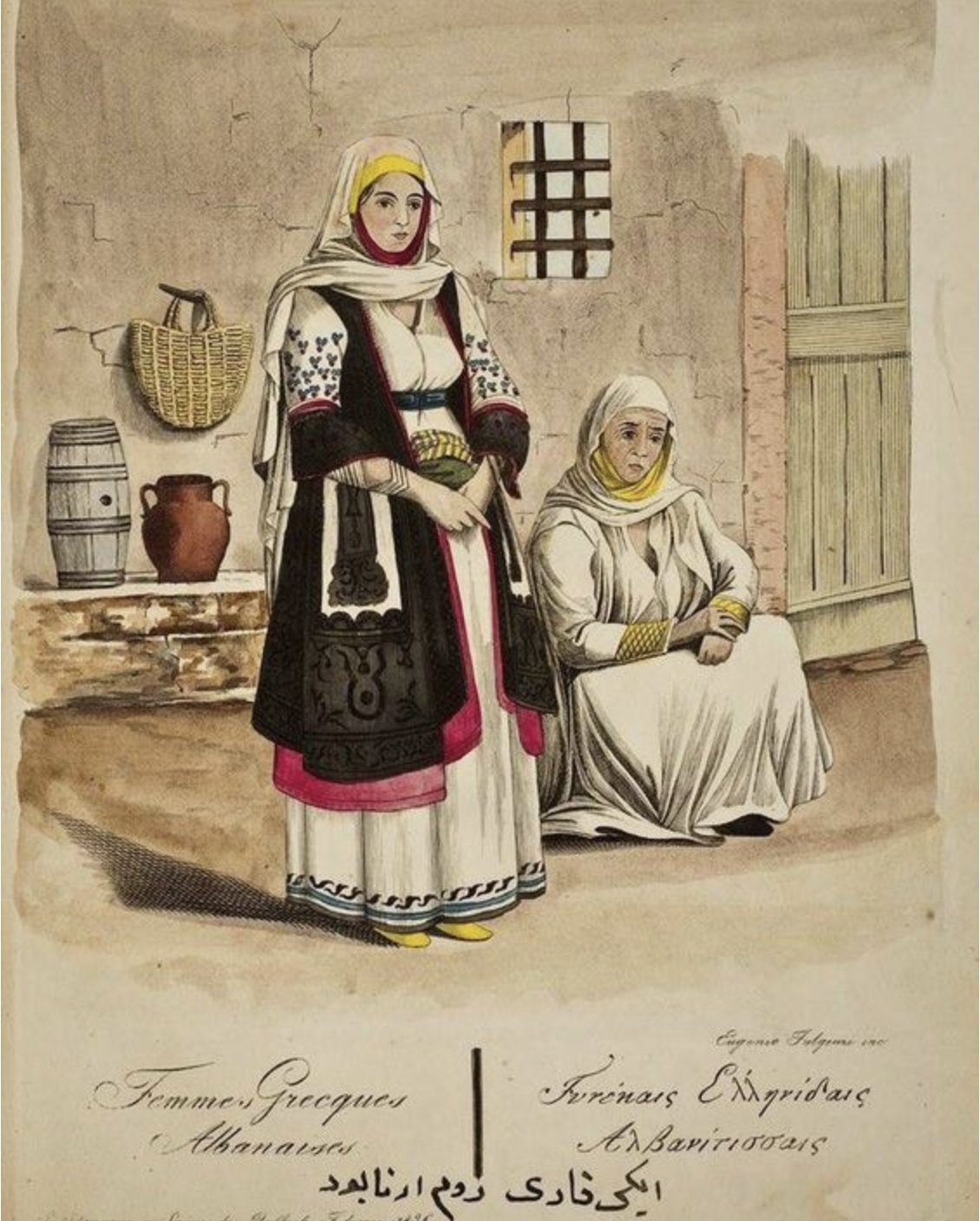
Arvanite women in Attica

Women held a relatively strong position in traditional Arvanitic society. Women had a say in public issues concerning their phara, and also often bore arms. Widows could inherit the status and privileges of their husbands and thus acquire leading roles within a fara, as did, for instance, Laskarina Bouboulina.

=== Arvanitic songs ===
Traditional Arvanite folk songs offer valuable information about social values and ideals of Arvanitic societies.

=== Dress ===
The traditional clothing of Arvanites included distinctive attire that sometimes identified them in past times as Arvanites from other neighbouring populations. Arvanite males on the Greek mainland wore the fustanella, a pleated like skirt garment or kilt, while those who lived on some Aegean islands wore baggy breeches of the seafaring Greeks.

Arvanite women were known for wearing a chemise shirt that was heavily embroidered. They also wore a heavily embroidered foundi or gown like garment that was heavily embroidered in silk and on the mainland the sigouni, a woolen thick white coat. On the Aegean islands, Arvanite women wore silk gowns with Turkish influences. Terms for Arvanite female clothing were in Arvanitika rather than in Greek.

== Notable people ==
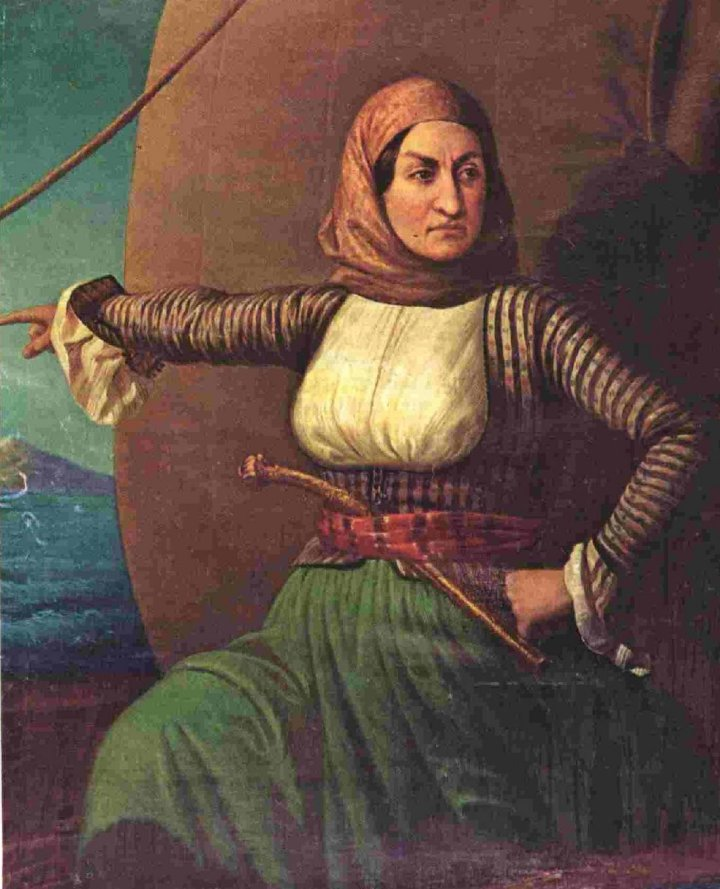
Laskarina Bouboulina

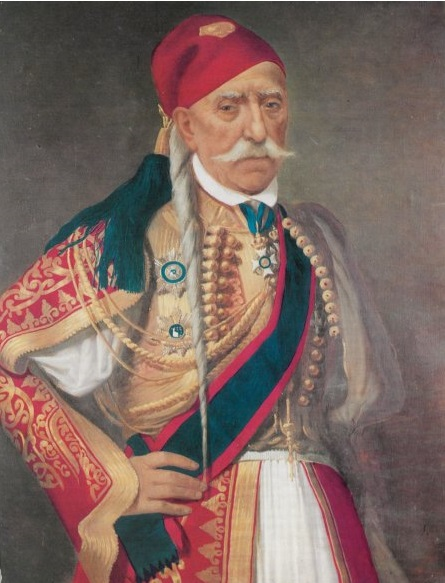
Dimitris Plapoutas

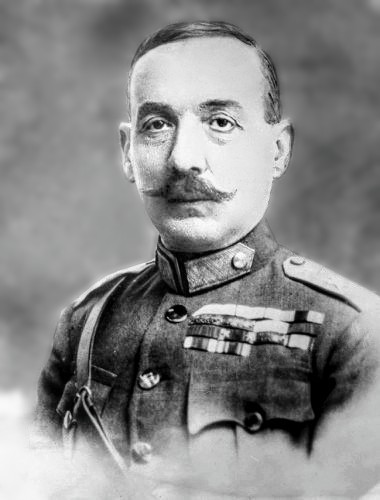
Theodoros Pangalos (general)

=== Greek War of Independence ===
- Laskarina Bouboulina, female member of Filiki Etaireia
- Georgios Kountouriotis, from Hydra, admiral (and briefly Prime Minister)
- Ioannis Orlandos
- Odysseas Androutsos
- Lazaros Kountouriotis
- Andreas Miaoulis
- Dimitris Plapoutas
- Hatzigiannis Mexis
- Anastasios Tsamados

==== Presidents of Greece ====
- Pavlos Kountouriotis, admiral

==== Prime Ministers of Greece ====
- Antonios Kriezis (also served in the Greek navy during the Revolution)
- Alexandros Diomidis

=== Politicians ===
- Theodoros Pangalos, former minister of foreign affairs and deputy prime minister

=== Clergymen ===
- Archbishop Ieronymos II of Athens, incumbent Archbishop of Athens.

=== Military ===
- Theodoros Pangalos, general and briefly military dictator.
- Alexandros Kontoulis
- Dimitrios Kriezis

=== Literature ===
- Panayotis Koupitoris
- Anastas Kullurioti, Albanian nationalist author

=== Folklore ===
- Aristeidis Kollias
- Vangelis Liapis, folklorist and Albanologist

=== Science ===
- Tasos Neroutsos, physician and scholar

=== Artists ===
- Eleni Boukoura-Altamoura, painter

=== Architecture ===
- Periklis Papapetrou, architect and politician

== See also ==
- Albanians in Greece
- Arvanitika
- Arvanitic alphabet
- Souliotes
- Arbëreshë
- Arnauts
- Stratioti
- The Voice of Albania

== Sources ==
- Athanassopoulou, Angélique (2005). "Nos Albanais à nous': Travailleurs émigrés dans une communauté arvanite du Péloponnèse" ["'Our own Albanians': Migrant workers in a Peloponnese Arvanitic community"]". Ethnologie française. 35. doi:10.3917/ethn.052.0267.
- Bakaoukas, Michael. "Modern Greek National Identity". Center for Applied Philosophy: The Radical Academy. (Online text)
- Banfi, Emanuele (1996), "Minoranze linguistiche in Grecia: Problemi storico- e sociolinguistici" ["Linguistic minorities in Greece: Historical and sociolinguistic problems"]. In: C. Vallini (ed.), Minoranze e lingue minoritarie: Convegno internazionale. Naples: Universitario Orientale. 89–115.
- Bintliff, John (2003), "The Ethnoarchaeology of a "Passive" Ethnicity: The Arvanites of Central Greece" in K.S. Brown and Yannis Hamilakis, eds., The Usable Past: Greek Metahistories, Lexington Books. ISBN 0-7391-0383-0.
- Biris, Kostas (1960): Αρβανίτες, οι Δωριείς του νεότερου Ελληνισμού: H ιστορία των Ελλήνων Αρβανιτών. ["Arvanites, the Dorians of modern Greece: History of the Greek Arvanites"]. Athens. (3rd ed. 1998: ISBN 960-204-031-9)
- Botsi, Eleni (2003): Die sprachliche Selbst- und Fremdkonstruktion am Beispiel eines arvanitischen Dorfes Griechenlands: Eine soziolinguistische Studie. ("Linguistic construction of the self and the other in an Arvanitic village in Greece: A sociolinguistic study"). PhD dissertation, University of Konstanz, Germany. Online text
- Breu, Walter (1990): "Sprachliche Minderheiten in Italien und Griechenland" ["Linguistic minorities in Italy and Greece"]. In: B. Spillner (ed.), Interkulturelle Kommunikation. Frankfurt: Lang. 169–170.
- Christoforides, Konst. (1904): Lexikon tis Alvanikis Glossis. Athens: P.D. Sakellariou.
- Clogg, Richard (2002): Minorities in Greece: Aspect of a Plural Society. Oxford: Hurst.
- Dede, Maria (1978): Αρβανίτικα Τραγούδια. Athens: Καστανιώτης.
- Dede, Maria (1987): Οι Έλληνες Αρβανίτες. ["The Greek Arvanites"]. Ioannina: Idryma Voreioipirotikon Erevnon.
- P. Dimitras, M. Lenkova (1997): "'Unequal rights' for Albanians in the southern Balkans". Greek Helsinki Monitor Report, AIM Athens, October 1997.
- Prévélakis, Georges. "The Hellenic Diaspora and the Greek State: A Spatial Approach". Geopolitics, Autumn 2000, Vol. 5 Issue 2, p. 171–185.
- Ducellier, Alain (1968): "L'Arbanon et les Albanais", Travaux et mémoires 3: 353–368.
- Ducellier, Alain (1994): Οι Αλβανοί στην Ελλάδα (13–15 αι.): Η μετανάστευση μίας κοινότητας. ["The Albanians in Greece (13th–15th cent.): A community's migration"]. Athens: Idhrima Gulandri Horn.
- Euromosaic (1996): "L'arvanite / albanais en Grèce". Report published by the Institut de Sociolingüística Catalana. Online version
- Furikis, Petros (1931): "Πόθεν το εθνικόν Αρβανίτης;" ["Whence the ethnonym Arvanites?"] Αθήνα 43: 3–37.
- Furikis, Petros (1934): "Η εν Αττική ελληνοαλβανική διάλεκτος". ["The Greek-Albanian dialect in Attica"] Αθήνα 45: 49–181.
- Gefou-Madianou, Dimitra. "Cultural Polyphony and Identity Formation: Negotiating Tradition in Attica." American Ethnologist. Vol. 26, No. 2., (May 1999), pp. 412–439.
- Gkikas, Yannis (1978): Οι Αρβανίτες και το αρβανίτικο τραγούδι στην Ελλάδα ["Arvanites and arvanitic song in Greece"]. Athens.
- Goodwin, Jason. Lords of the Horizons: A History of the Ottoman Empire. Macmillan, 2003. ISBN 0-312-42066-8
- Gounaris, Vassilis (2006): "Σύνοικοι, θυρωροί και φιλοξενούμενοι: διερεύνοντας τη 'μεθώριο' του ελληνικού και του αλβανικού έθνους κατά τον 19ο αιώνα." ["Compatriots, doorguards and guests: investigating the 'periphery' of the Greek and the Albanian nation during the 19th century"] In: P. Voutouris and G. Georgis (eds.), Ο ελληνισμός στον 19ο αιώνα: ιδεολογίες και αισθητικές αναζητήσεις. Athens: Kastanioti.
- Grapsitis, Vasilis (1989): Οι Αρβανίτες ["The Arvanites"]. Athens.
- GHM (=Greek Helsinki Monitor) (1995): "Report: The Arvanites". Online report
- Haebler, Claus (1965): Grammatik der albanischen Mundarten von Salamis ["The grammar of the Albanian dialects of Salamis"]. Wiesbaden: Harassowitz.
- Hall, Jonathan M. (2000). Ethnic Identity in Greek Antiquity. Cambridge University Press. p. 29. ISBN 9780521789998.
- Jochalas, Titos P. (1971): Über die Einwanderung der Albaner in Griechenland: Eine zusammenfassene Betrachtung ["On the immigration of Albanians to Greece: A summary"]. München: Trofenik.
- Kollias, Aristidis (1983): Αρβανίτες και η καταγωγή των Ελλήνων. ["Arvanites and the descent of the Greeks"]. Athens.
- Kocollari, Irakli (1992): Arvanitet ["The Arvanites"]. Tirana.
- Lawrence, Christopher (2007): Blood and oranges: European markets and immigrant labor in rural Greece. Berghan Books. (ISBN 1-8454-5307-7)
- Levy, Jacques (2000): From Geopolitics to Global Politics: A French Connection (ISBN 0-7146-5107-9)
- Magliveras, Simeon. "Organic Memory, Local Culture and National History: An Arvanite Village" University of Durham Department of Anthropology
- Mavrogordatos, George. Stillborn Republic: Social Conditions and Party Strategies in Greece, 1922–1936. Berkeley: University of California Press, 1983.
- Moraitis, Thanassis (2002): Anthology of Arvanitika songs of Greece. Athens. (ISBN 960-85976-7-6)
- MRG (=Minority Rights Group) (1991): Greece and its minorities. London: Minority Rights Publications.
- Panagiotopulos, Vasilis (1985): Πληθυσμός και οικισμοί της Πελοποννήσου, 13ος-18ος αιώνας. ["Population and settlements in the Peloponnese, 13th–18th centuries"]. Athens: Istoriko Archeio, Emporiki Trapeza tis Elladas.
- Paschidis, Athanasios (1879): Οι Αλβανοί και το μέλλον αυτών εν τω Ελληνισμώ ["The Albanians and their future in the Greek nation"]. Athens.
- Poulos, Ioannis (1950): "Η εποίκησις των Αλβανών εις Κορινθίαν" ["The settlement of the Albanians in Corinthia"]. Επετηρίς μεσαιωνικού αρχείου, Athens. 31–96.
- Sasse, Hans-Jürgen (1985): "Sprachkontakt und Sprachwandel: Die Gräzisierung der albanischen Mundarten Griechenlands" ["Language contact and language change: The Hellenization of the Albanian dialects of Greece"]. Papiere zur Linguistik 32(1). 37–95.
- Sasse, Hans-Jürgen (1991): Arvanitika: Die albanischen Sprachreste in Griechenland ["Arvanitic: The Albanian language relics in Greece"]. Wiesbaden.
- Schukalla, Karl-Josef (1993): "Nationale Minderheiten in Albanien und Albaner im Ausland." ["National minorities in Albania and Albanians abroad"]. In: K.-D. Grothusen (ed.), Südosteuropa-Handbuch: Albanien. Göttingen: Vandenhoeck & Ruprecht. 505–528.
- Schwandner-Sievers, Stephanie; Fischer, Bernd Jürgen, eds. (2002): Albanian Identities: Myth and History. Bloomington, IN: Indiana University Press. (ISBN 0-253-21570-6)
- Sella-Mazi, Eleni (1997): "Διγλωσσία και ολιγώτερο ομιλούμενες γλώσσες στην Ελλάδα" ["Diglossia and lesser-spoken languages in Greece"]. In: K. Tsitselikis, D. Christopoulos (eds.), Το μειονοτικό φαινόμενο στην Ελλάδα ["The minority phenomenon in Greece"]. Athens: Ekdoseis Kritiki. 349–413.
- Stylos, N. (2003): Στοιχεία προϊστορίας σε πανάρχαια αρβανίτικα κείμενα. ["Prohistorical evidence in ancient Arvanitic texts"]. Ekdoseis Gerou
- Trudgill, Peter (1976/77): "Creolization in reverse: Reduction and simplification in the Albanian dialects of Greece." Transactions of the Philological Society (Vol?), 32–50.
- Trudgill, Peter (1986): Dialects in contact. Oxford: Blackwell.
- Trudgill, Peter (2000): "Greece and European Turkey: From Religious to Linguistic Identity", in S Barbour, C Carmichael (eds.), Language and nationalism in Europe, Oxford University Press.
- Trudgill, Peter (2004): "Glocalisation and the Ausbau sociolinguistics of modern Europe". In: A. Duszak, U. Okulska (eds.), Speaking from the margin: Global English from a European perspective. Frankfurt: Peter Lang. Online article
- Trudgill, Peter, George A. Tzavaras (1977): "Why Albanian-Greeks are not Albanians: Language shift in Attika and Biotia." In: H. Giles (ed.), Language, ethnicity and intergroup relations. London: Academic Press. 171–184.
- Tsigos, Athanasios (1991): Κείμενα για τους Αρβανίτες. ["Texts about Arvanites"]. Athens.
- Tsitsipis, Lukas (1981): Language change and language death in Albanian speech communities in Greece: A sociolinguistic study. PhD dissertation, University of Wisconsin, Madison.
- Tsitsipis, Lukas (1983): "Language shift among the Albanian speakers of Greece." Anthropological Linguisitcs 25(3): 288–308.
- Tsitsipis, Lukas (1995): "The coding of linguistic ideology in Arvanitika (Albanian): Language shift, congruent and contradictory discourse." Anthropological Linguistics 37: 541–577.
- Tsitsipis, Lukas (1998): Αρβανίτικα και Ελληνικά: Ζητήματα πολυγλωσσικών και πολυπολιτισμικών κοινοτήτων. ["Arvanitic and Greek: Issues of multilingual and multicultural communities"]. Vol. 1. Livadeia.
- Vranousi, E. (1970): "Οι όροι 'Αλβανοί' και 'Αρβανίται' και η πρώτη μνεία του ομωνύμου λαού εις τας πηγάς του ΙΑ' αιώνος." ["The terms 'Albanoi' and 'Arbanitai' and the earliest references to the people of that name in the sources of the 11th century"]. Σuμμεικτα 2: 207–254.
- Liakopoulos, Georgios C. (2019). The Early Ottoman Peloponnese: a study in the light of an annotated edition princeps of the TT10-1/14662 Ottoman taxation cadastre (ca. 1460–1463). Gingko. ISBN 978-1909942325.
- Biris, Kostas (1998). Αρβανίτες: οι Δωριείς του Νεώτερου Ελληνισμού (in Greek). Melissa. ISBN 978-960-204-031-7.
- Koryllos, Christos (1890). Η Εθνογραφία της Πελοποννήσου: Απάντησις εις τα υπό του κ. A. Philippson γραφέντα (in Greek).
- Liakopoulos, Georgios C. (2015). "A Study of the Early Ottoman Peloponnese in the Light of an Annotated editio princeps of the TT10-1/14662 Ottoman Taxation Cadastre (c.1460–1463)". Comparative Oriental Manuscript Studies Bulletin. 1. doi:10.25592/uhhfdm.407. ISSN 2410-0951.
- Liakopoulos, Georgios C. (2022). "The Integration of Settlers into Existing Socio-Environmental Settings: Reclaiming the Greek Lands After the Late Medieval Crisis". In Izdebski, Adam; Haldon, John; Filipkowski, Piotr (eds.). Perspectives on Public Policy in Societal-Environmental Crises: What the Future Needs from History. Springer. ISBN 978-3030941376.
- Milios, John (2023). Nationalism as a Claim to a State. BRILL. ISBN 978-90-04-53352-3.
