= Vangelis Liapis =

Greek scholar and folklorist

Vangelis Liapis (Greek: Βαγγέλης Λιάπης, August 14, 1914 – February 12, 2008) was a Greek scholar and folklorist.

== Life ==
Vangelis Liapis was born on 14 August 1914 in Eleusis near Athens, Greece. He was of Arvanite origin. In 1932, he entered the Faculty of Law of the National and Kapodistrian University of Athens. From 1938 to 1940 he served his military service as a secretary in the Greek Army and fought in the Greco-Italian War. After the war, from January to March 1945 he was jailed for Communism-related activities. He lived for most of his life in Eleusina, where he died on 12 February 2008.

== Works ==
During his life Liapis wrote 39 books, regarding mainly the folklore of his home region of Eleusina and the Arvanites in general. One of his works written in Arvanitika and Greek under the name Arvanitika Miroloya (Greek: Αρβανίτικα μοιρολόγια) includes laments from Attica using both Greek and Albanian alphabets. In 1995 Sali Berisha, then President of Albania, decorated him with the Order Naim Frashëri, 1st Class, for his Albanological studies. In 1997 he became an honorary member of the Academy of Sciences of Albania.
