= Lechovo =

Lechovo Λέχοβο
- Municipal unit
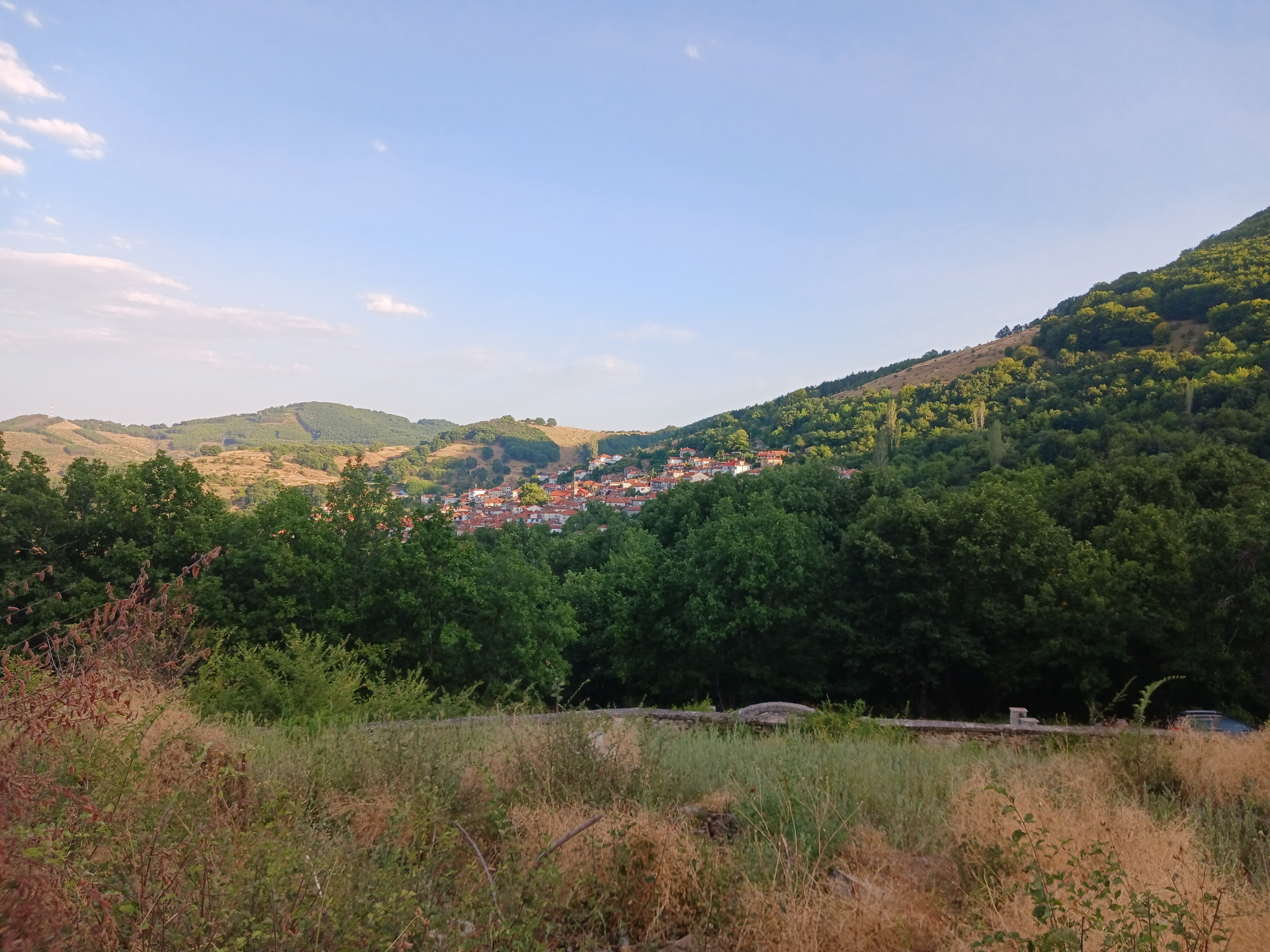
- Lechovo

- Location within the regional unit

- Location within Greece
- Coordinates: 40°35′N 21°30′E
- Country: Greece
- Administrative region: Western Macedonia
- Regional unit: Florina
- Municipality: Amyntaio

Area
  - Municipal unit: 22.8 km^{2} (8.8 sq mi)
- Elevation: 900 m (3,000 ft)

Population (2021)
  - Municipal unit: 782
  - Municipal unit density: 34.3/km^{2} (88.8/sq mi)
- Time zone: UTC+2 (EET)
  - Summer (DST): UTC+3 (EEST)
- Vehicle registration: ΡΑ

Lechovo (Greek: Λέχοβο), renamed as Iroiko (Greek: Ηρωϊκό) between 1955 and 1956, is a village and a former community in Florina regional unit, Western Macedonia, Greece. Since the 2011 local government reform it is part of the municipality Amyntaio, of which it is a municipal unit. The municipal unit has an area of 22.844 km^{2}, and a population of 782 (2021 census). The village is set amongst the mountains of Northern Greece and the main road runs through the town's centre. There is a museum, a football pitch and an indoor handball stadium. Lechovo has stone architecture common to many northern villages, and has an old upper square and church bell tower.

The population of the village was brought to the area by the Ottomans. Lehovo as a village became inhabited in the mid-eighteenth century and some of its villagers worked as master builders. In statistics gathered by Vasil Kanchov in 1900, Lechovo was populated by 750 Christian Albanians and 90 Aromanians. Lechovo, with its population of hellenised Albanians, participated extensively on the Greek side of the Macedonian Struggle in the late Ottoman period. Following the Young Turk Revolution, the Greek clergy's prominent position in places like Lechovo was contested by Aromanian and Albanian nationalists. During the population exchange between Greece and Turkey (1923), Lechovo's pro-Greek sentiments resulted in Greek authorities removing it from consideration as a resettlement destination in the Florina region for incoming Greek Anatolian refugees.

Lechovo had 1,194 inhabitants in 1981. In fieldwork done by anthropologist Riki Van Boeschoten in late 1993, Lechovo was populated by Arvanites. Arvanitika (close to Albanian) was spoken in the village by people over 30 in public and private settings. Children understood the language, but mostly did not use it. Aromanian was spoken by people over 60, mainly in private. In the early 2000s, the Tosk Albanian dialect was often spoken by village elders. Academic Pierre Sintes was in the Florina area doing research in the early 2010s. Sintes wrote Lechovo was populated by Arvanites who spoke Albanian and had a Greek national consciousness.

Lechovo has not been influenced by the nearby predominant Slavic musical tradition of the area, and villagers have no knowledge of songs from their neighbours. Dances performed in Lechovo are the Berati, Hasapia, Tsamiko, Kalamatiano, along with the Poustseno.

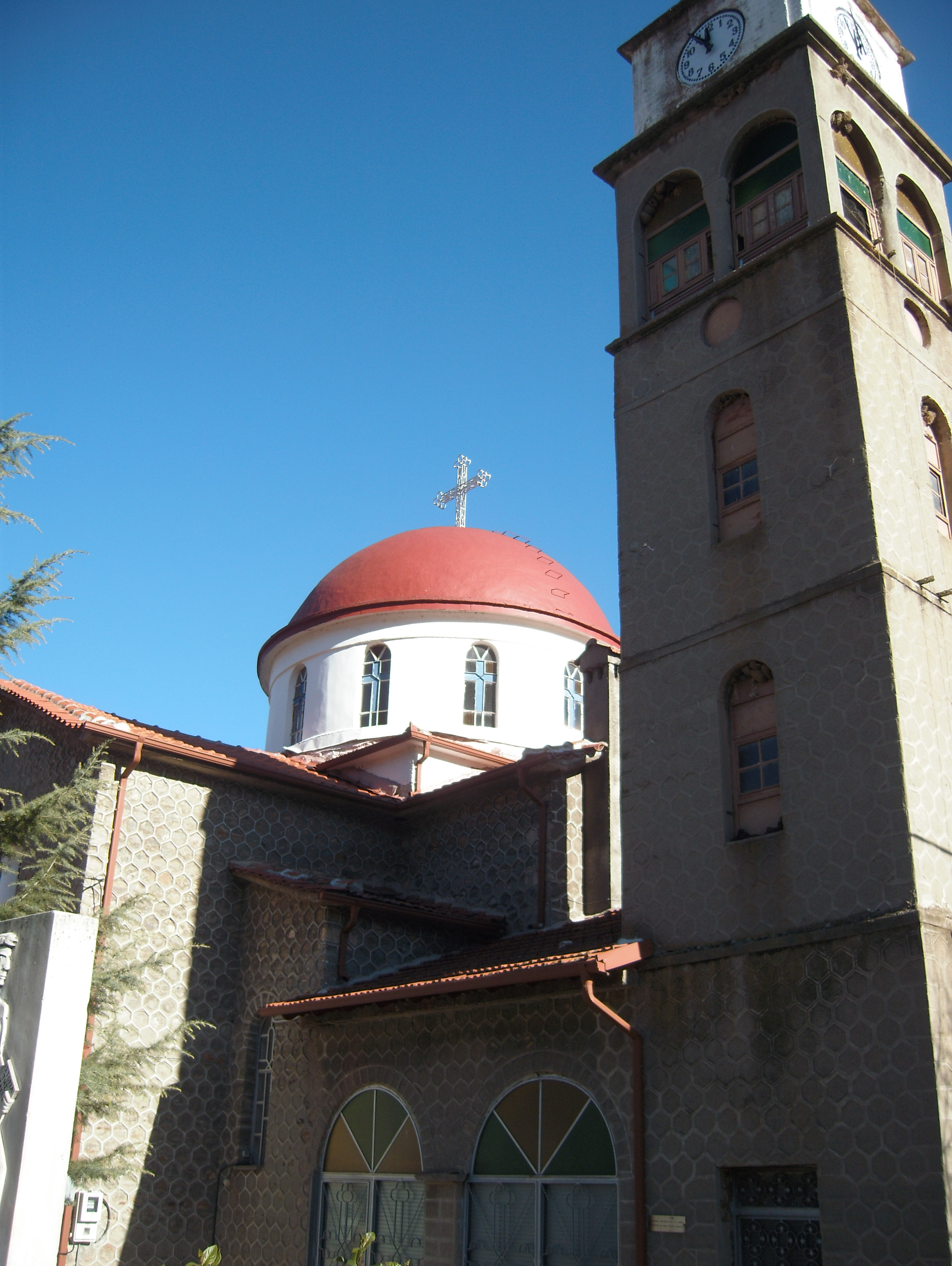
Lechovo Church

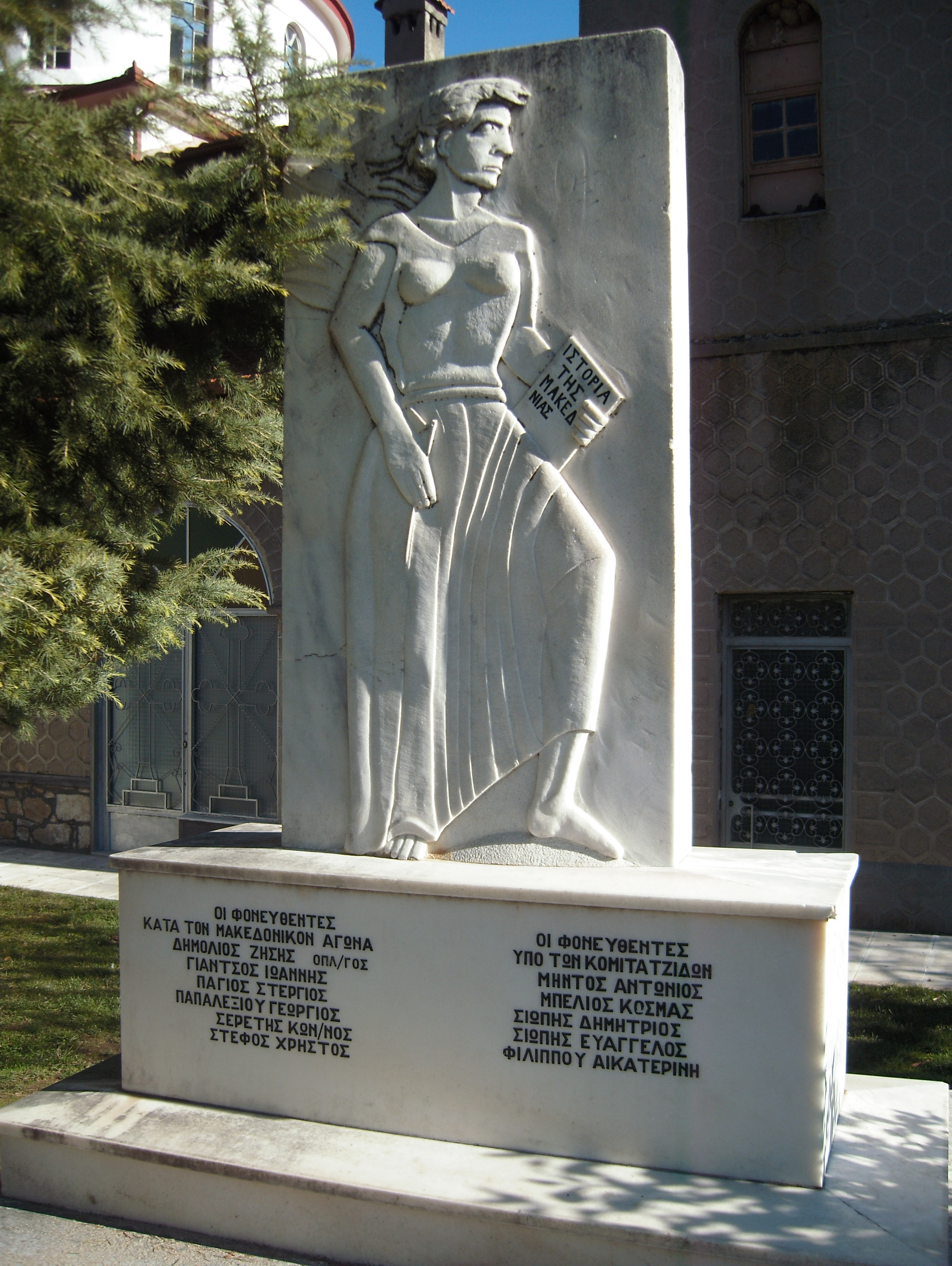
Macedonian Struggle Monument honouring Lechovo's participation

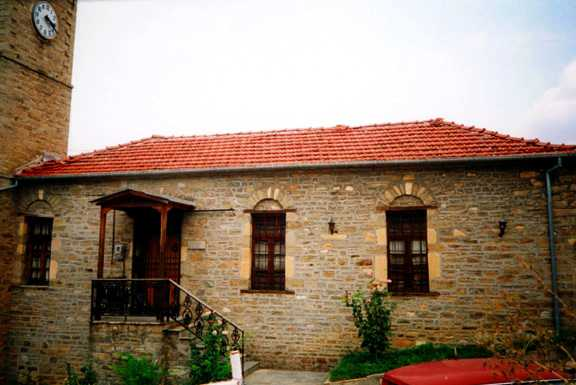
Lechovo Folklore Museum

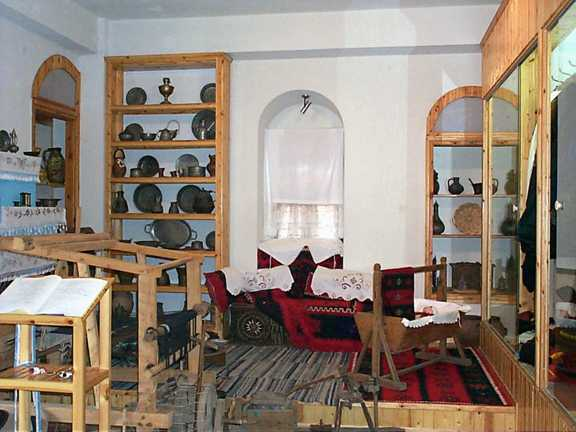
Traditional home items

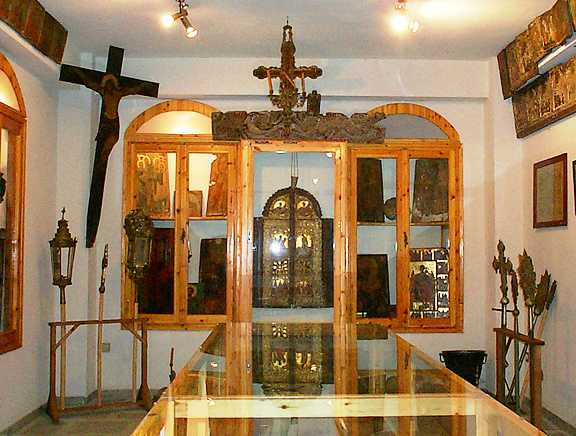
Icons and other religious items

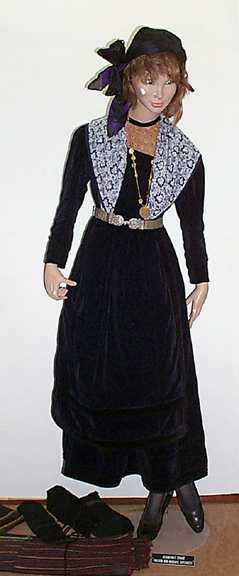
Traditional female clothing

== See also ==
- Folklore Museum (Lehovo)
