= Panayotis Koupitoris =

Greek-Albanian philologist

Panayotis Koupitoris (Greek: Παναγιώτης Κουπιτώρης, Arvanitika: Πανάjοτ Κουπιτόρι/Panajot Kupitori, 1821-1881) was a writer from the island of Hydra.

== Biography ==
Koupitoris originated from the local Arvanite population of Hydra. He studied literature at the University of Athens and was later principal of several secondary schools. He also organized a night school that taught in Arvanitika. In 1879 Koupitoris purchased a printing press and, along with Anastas Kullurioti, started the publication of the newspaper The Voice of Albania (Albanian: Zëri i Shqipërisë),

Koupitoris is the author of the Greek-language Meletai peri tis glossis kai tou ethnous Alvanias ("Studies on the Albanian language and people"), published in Athens in 1879. He is also said to have published a primer of Albanian in 1879, and wrote an etymological Albanian dictionary, as yet unpublished.

== His work and views ==
Panayotis Koupitoris was a lifelong researcher of the Albanian language and nation. In his book "Αλβανικαί Μελέται ‐ Πραγματεία ιστορική και φιλολογική περί της γλώσσης και του έθνους των Αλβανών" (English: Albanian Studies - An historical and literary essay about the Albanian nation and his language) in where he presents the core elements of his beliefs, after analyzing historically and literary the Albanian entity, concludes about the Albanian language that "αναγκάζεται τις να κατατάξη αυτήν εις τον ελληνολατινικόν κλάδον και να ομολογήση ότι της αλβανικής γλώσσης το πλείστον μέρος εστίν ελληνικόν, πολύ δε και το λατινικόν, σμικρόν δε τι μέρος το γερμανικόν και ελάχιστον το κελτικόν" (we have to classify it to the Greek-latin (linguistic) sector and to confess that the Albanian language is: mostly Greek, enough Latin, a little Germanic and at the minimum Celtic) p. 35. About the origin of the Illyrians and their language which he believes they were a relative to the Albanian, nation, he concludes: "Eκ των παρατεθειμένων συμπεραίνεται νομίζω ότι η ιλλυρική γλώσσα ην ουχί αλλότρια της ελληνικής, αλλά διάλεκτος αυτής απωτέρα των άλλων και οι Ιλλυριοί ελληνικόν φύλον." (From the above-mentioned we can conclude that the Illyrian is not a foreign to the Greek language, but a dialect of this, farthest from others, and the Illyrians a Greek subgroup." (p.49). He also wrote a study about the pronouns of the Albanian dialect in Greece and an extended Latin-Greek lexicon.

== Works ==
- Αλβανικαί μελέται: Πραγματεία ιστορική και φιλολογική περί της γλώσσης και του έθνους των Αλβανών. Υπό του Παναγιώτου Δ. Κουπιτώρη. Εν Αθήναις: Εκ του Τυπογραφείου του Μέλλοντος, 1879. (reprinted in 1979 by D. N. Karavioti)
- Διατριβή περί της παρ' Αλβανοίς αντωνυμίας του τρίτου προσώπου: Κατά την διάλεκτον των εν Ελλάδι Αλβανών μάλιστα την των Υδραίων, υπό Παναγ. Δ. Κουπιτώρη. Εν Αθήναις: Τυπογραφείον "Ο Παλαμήδης", 1879.
- Λεξικόν λατινοελληνικόν υπό Π. Κουπιτώρη. Αθήνησι: s. l., 1873.
- Λόγοι επικήδειοι εκφωνηθέντες εν Σμύρνη και εν Χαλκίδι κατά την κηδείαν και την ανακομιδήν των λειψάνων του στρατηγού Νικολάου Κριεζώτου. Εν Αθήναις Αθ. Μαυρομμάτη, 1863. (contributor)
- Λόγος πανηγυρικός περί της καθ' ημάς Εκκλησιαστικής Μουσικής: συνταχθείς κατ'εντολήν του Εν Αθήναις Εκκλησιαστικού Μουσικού συλλόγου και απαγγελθείς εν τη αιθούση αυτού τη Δ΄ Δεκεμβρίου 1874, πρώτη επετείω της συστάσεως αυτού υπό Π. Κουπιτώρη. 1876.
- Πλάτωνος Κρίτων. Κείμενον, σχόλια και μετάφρασις χάριν των εις τα Γυμνάσια φοιτώντων νέων υπό Παναγ. Δ. Κουπιτώρη. Εν Αθήναις: Εκ του Τυπογραφείου της Φιλοκαλίας,1879.
