= The Voice of Albania (newspaper) =

Greek-Arvanite newspaper

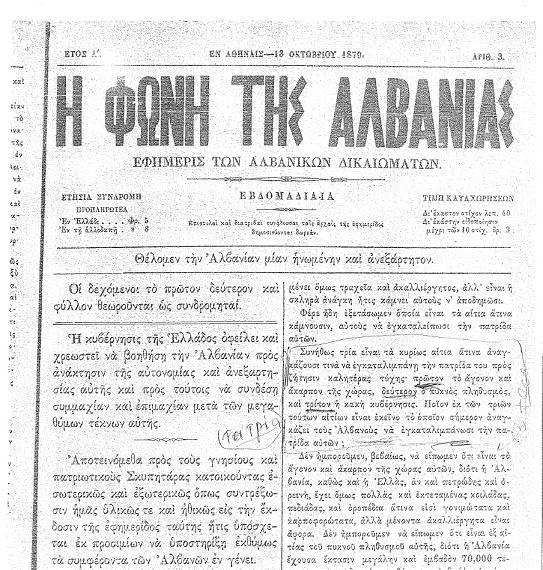
Front page of "Η φωνή της Αλβανίας" issue, October 18, 1879

The Voice of Albania, Greek: Η φωνή της Αλβανίας, was a newspaper published in Athens, Kingdom of Greece, from September 1879 to mid-1880. The publishers were Anastasios Koulouriotis and Panayotis Koupitoris, both Arvanites.

It was published in Greek and partly in Albanian (Arvanitika dialect). The core political views backed the ideas of contribution of Albanophones in Greece, Albanian schools and education, independence of Albania from Ottoman Empire, a unified Greek-Albanian state, and the similarities between two nations. It was printed in a print-shop owned by Koupitoris.

== See also ==
- Arvanites
- Albanians in Greece
- Albanian national awakening
