= Tasos Neroutsos =

Greek physician and scholar

Tasos Neroutsos (Greek: Τάσος Νερούτσος; 1826–1892) was a Greek physician and scholar.

Neroutsos was born in Athens in 1826 to an Arvanite family. From 1848 to 1884, he studied medicine at the Ludwig-Maximilians-Universität München. During his studies he corrected and translated into German the works of Lord Byron and Guilielmus Xylander regarding Albanians. During the era before the Congress of Monastir, in which the final form of the Albanian alphabet was decided, he was among the Arvanite scholars who supported the use of the Latin alphabet. Neroutsos lived for most of his life in Alexandria, Egypt where he conducted Egyptological studies. He was the first to publish an archaeological review of the 1874 excavations of Hellenistic tombs in Alexandria. Neroutsos died in 1892, while his family emigrated in the German Empire. His descendant Helga Neroutsos-Hartinger published his correspondence with Albanologist Gustav Meyer.

== Bibliography ==
- Neroutsas-Hartinger, Helga (1992), «Der Briefwechsel zwischen Tassos Neroutsos Bey und Gustav Meyer. Ein Beitrag zur Geschichte der Albanologie», in Südost-Forschungen 51, 1992, p. 105-148.
- Chrysikopoulos, V. (2008), «Contribution à l’étude de l’histoire d’égyptologie : Tassos Neroutsos et la genèse de l’égyptologie en Grèce. Nikolaos Boufidis et la collection d’antiquités égyptiennes du musée national d’Athènes» («Contribution to the study of the history of Egyptology: Tassos Neroutsos and the birth of Egyptology in Greece. Nikolaos Boufidis and the collection of Egyptian antiquities in the National Archaeological Museum»), Hommages Jean Claude Goyon, Cairo: IFAO (BiÉtud) 143, p. 87-98.
- Chrysikopoulos, V. (2011), «La réception de l’Egypte ancienne dans la Grèce du XIXe siècle: Egyptologues avertis, voyageurs passionnes et gout oriental» («The reception of Ancient Egypt in Greece in the 19th century: Aware Egyptologists, passionate voyagers and oriental taste»), in Francis, J.E. and Harrison, G. W. M. (eds.), Life and Death in Ancient Egypt. The Diniacopoulos Collection, Montréal : Concordia University, p. 18-27.
- Chrysikopoulos, V. (2013), «A l’aube de l’égyptologie hellénique et de la constitution des collections égyptiennes: Des nouvelles découvertes sur Giovanni d’Anastasi et Tassos Neroutsos» («At the dawn of Hellenic Egyptology and of the constitution of Egyptian collection: New discoveries on Giovanni d’Anastasi and Tassos Neroutsos»), in Kousoulis, P. and Lazaridis, N. Proceedings of the Tenth International Congress of Egyptologists, Leuven: Peeters [In press].
