= Anastas Kullurioti =

Albanian writer

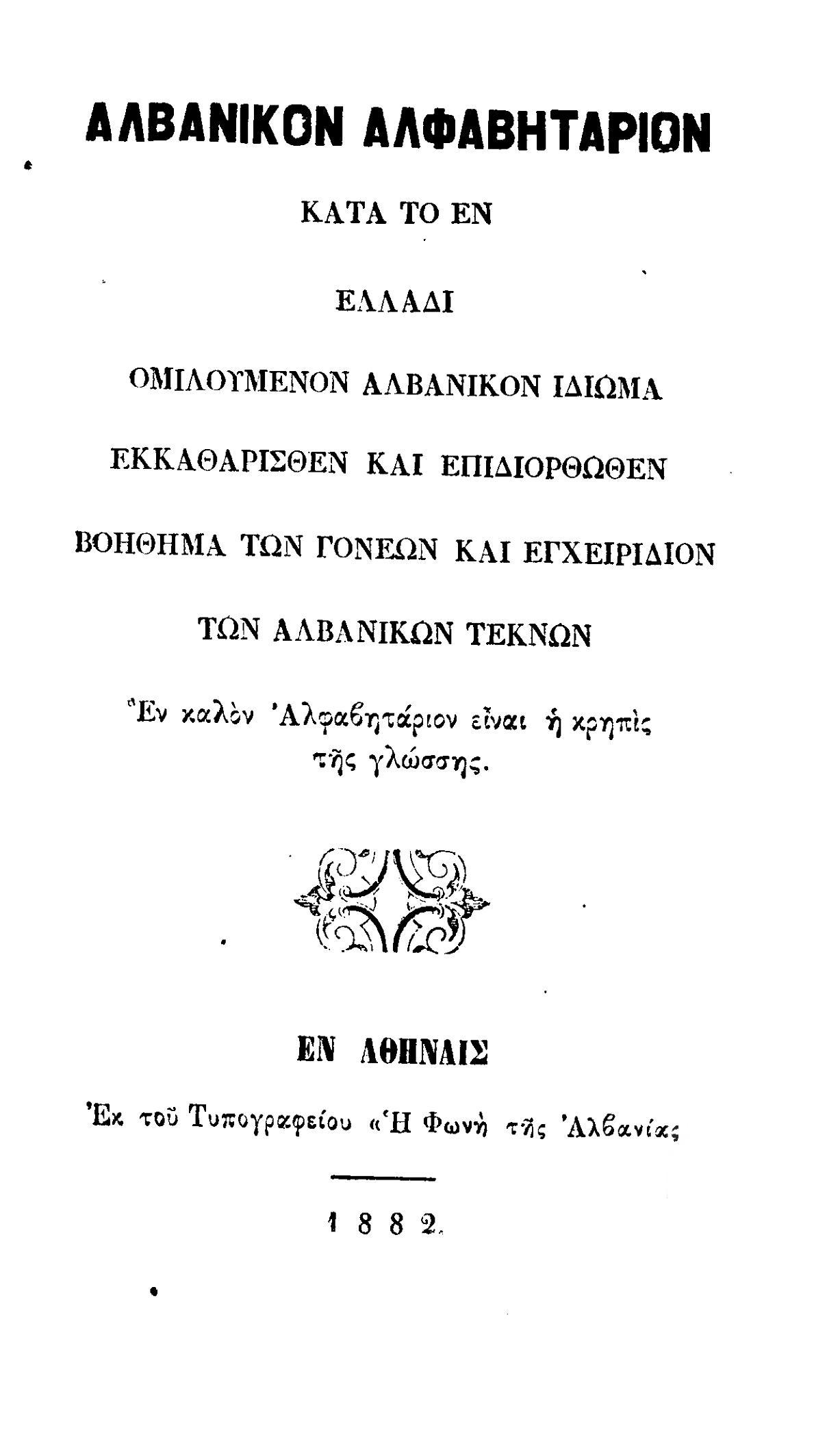
Alvanikon Alfavitarion, or Abavatar arbëror.

Anastas Kullurioti or Anastasios Koulouriotis (Greek: Αναστάσιος Κουλουριώτης; 1822–1887) was an Arvanite Albanian writer and nationalist figure in Greece.

== Biography ==
Born in Salamis^{[a]}, Ottoman Greece of Arvanite descent, he spent some of his early years there and later moved to Athens, where he settled in the Plaka district, being noted at the time as the "Albanian quarter" of the city. Still a young man, he emigrated to America and made his fortune, although little is known about that period of his life.

Upon his return to Greece, along with Panayotis Koupitoris, he founded the weekly Η φωνή της Αλβανίας (English: The Voice of Albania), which lasted from September 1879 to mid-1880. Among the goals of his nationalist activities were the founding of an Albanian political party in Greece, the opening of Albanian-language schools and the liberation of Albania from the Ottoman rule. In early 1880s, he traveled south Albania to win support for the nationalist cause, which inevitably brought him into conflict with both Turkish and Greek authorities. He was arrested in Gjirokastër with the request of the Greek consul and extradited to Corfu. He was imprisoned in Greece for some time, and he is said to have died poisoned in prison in Athens at the beginning of 1887.

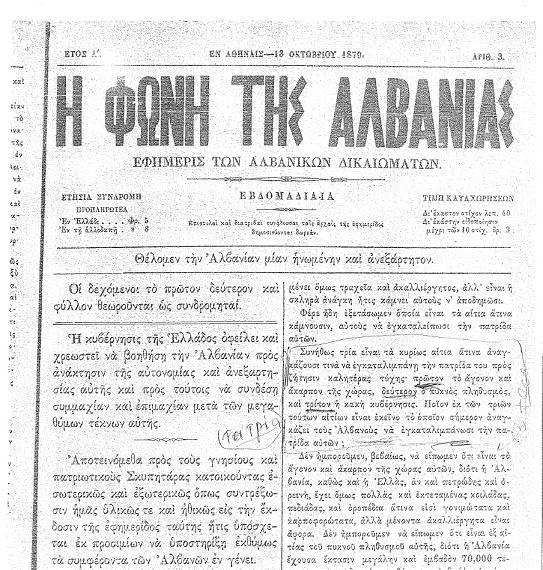
Front page of "The Voice of Albania" issue, October 18, 1879

== Works ==
- Αλβανικόν Αλφαβητάριον, (English: Albanian Primer Athens, 1882);
- Reader Klumësht për foshnja (English: Milk for Babies Athens, 1882).

== Notes and references ==
=== Notes ===
a.	According to Elsie and Faensen he was born in Plaka district

== Bibliography ==
- Faensen, Johannes: Die albanische Nationalbewegung. p.120.
- Reso, Zihni: Anastas Kullurioti dhe gazeta "Zëri i Shqipërisë," 1879-1880.
- Skëndi, Stavro: The Albanian national awakening, 1878-1912.
- Elsie, Robert: Historical Dictionary of Albania. p. 252-253.
- Lloshi, Xhevat (2008). Rreth Alfabetit te Shqipes [Around the Albanian Alphabet]. Logos. ISBN 9789989582684.
