= Lechovo Folklore Museum =

Museum in Lechovo, Greece

Coordinates: 40.5841°N 21.4922°E

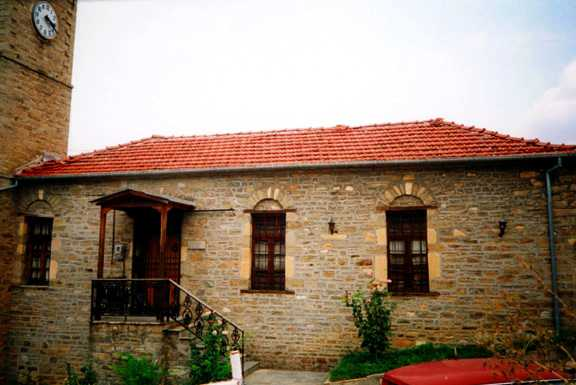
Outside view of the Museum

Lechovo is a historic village on the Kastoria–Amyndaio road, near the Kleissoura pass. In 1977, the Prophet Elijah Association of Lehovites started to collect artefacts of folk culture and ecclesiastical objects and to put together its folklore collection. Since 1980, the collection has been housed in a renovated historic building just off the main square, which is now the Lehovo Folklore Museum. The purpose of the museum is to preserve the traditions and the history of the village, which is why all the exhibits come from Lehovo itself.

The museum has many noteworthy ecclesiastical exhibits, most notably an altar door from the Church of Agia Paraskevi (1760), an icon of St Demetrios with twelve smaller representations, an icon of the Virgin Mary and Christ from the Church of Agios Demetrios (1763), an icon of St Constantine and St Helen from the same church (1600), and an icon of Elijah (16th century). There are also ecclesiastical accessories, such as silver banners, gospels (1776, 1860), an antimension (1840), two chalices (1862, 1890), menaia printed in Venice in 1680 and 1860, part of a chancel screen (17th century), and several chancel-screen icons.

Apart from the ecclesiastical exhibits, visitors may see traditional women's costumes, both for official occasions and for everyday wear, a shepherd's cape of waterproof goat's hair, belt-buckles for the local costumes and for priests, and weaponry used during the Macedonian Struggle. There are also tools of various local trades, such as stoneworking, tailoring, farriery, and shoemaking. The museum has a classic loom, woven textiles, a low round table, and domestic utensils and appliances.
