= Periklis Papapetrou =

- Περικλής Παπαπέτρου
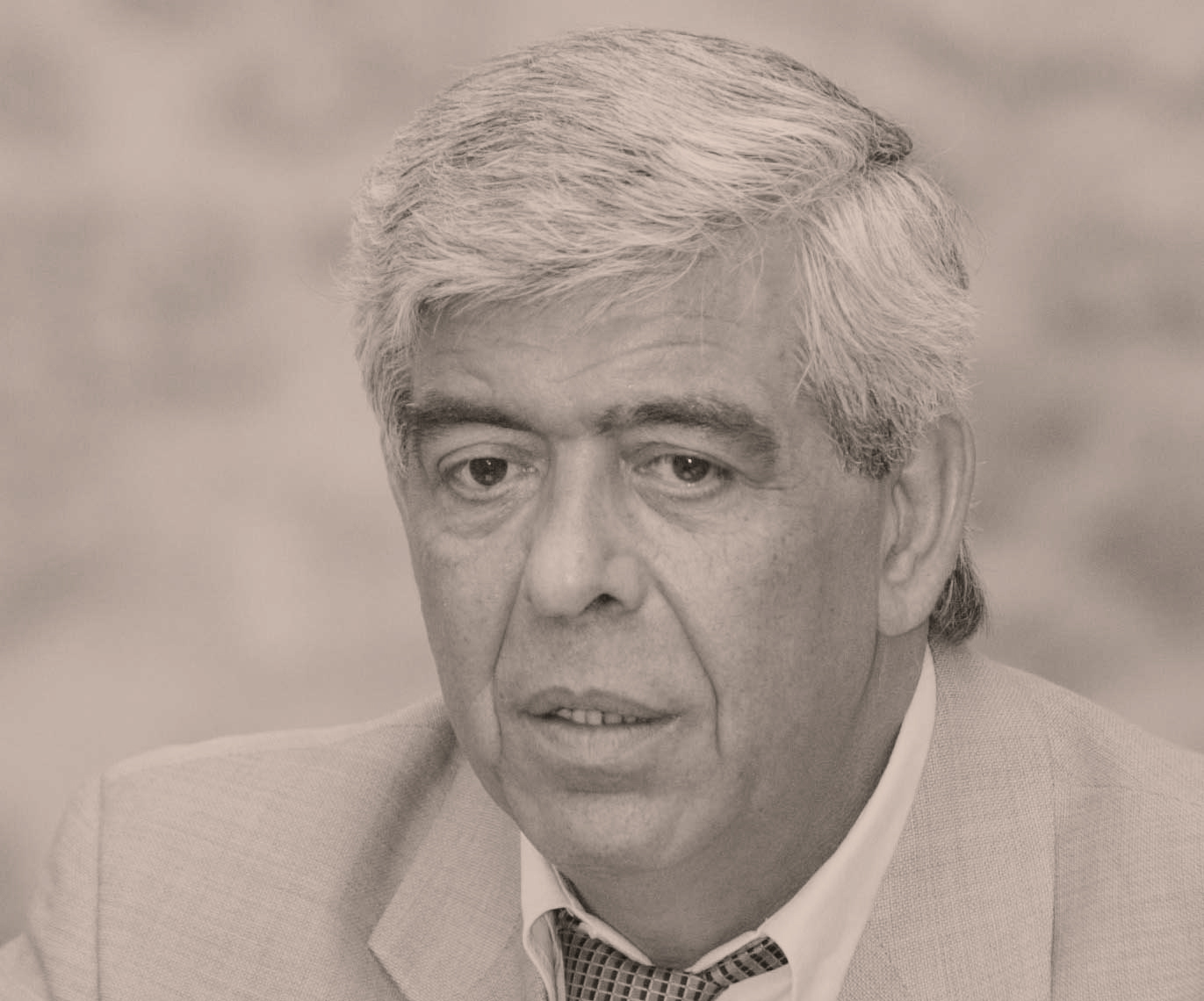
- Born: 1948; Eleusis, Greece
- Died: 21 August 2012 (aged 63–64); Eleusis, Greece
- Education: National Technical University of Athens
- Occupations: Architect, Politician
- Political party: PASOK

Periklis Papapetrou (Greek: Περικλής Παπαπέτρου; 1947–2012) was a Greek architect and politician. He served as mayor of Eleusis and was the first elected prefect of Western Attica, serving the prefectural government from 1994 to 2002.

== Life and work ==
He was born in Eleusis. He then studied Architecture at the National Technical University of Athens and from his early student years he was active in politics and communal self-administration. He was elected in 1987 as mayor of Eleusis, acting as such until 1994. There he is known for his ecologically friendly policies including the carrying out of a referendum in 1991 against the expansion of the operating oil refinery of Hellenic Petroleum in Eleusis, which he won.
