= Southern Greece =

Southern Greece (Greek: Νότια Ελλάδα) is a loosely defined geographical term, usually encompassing the Peloponnese peninsula and varying parts of Continental Greece (Attica is usually included), as well as the islands of the Cyclades, the Dodecanese, and Crete. It has never corresponded to a specific administrative or other entity, but is usually defined in juxtaposition with Northern Greece.
