= Arvanitika =

Variety of Albanian traditionally spoken by the Arvanites, a population group in Greece

- αρbε̰ρίσ̈τ arbërisht
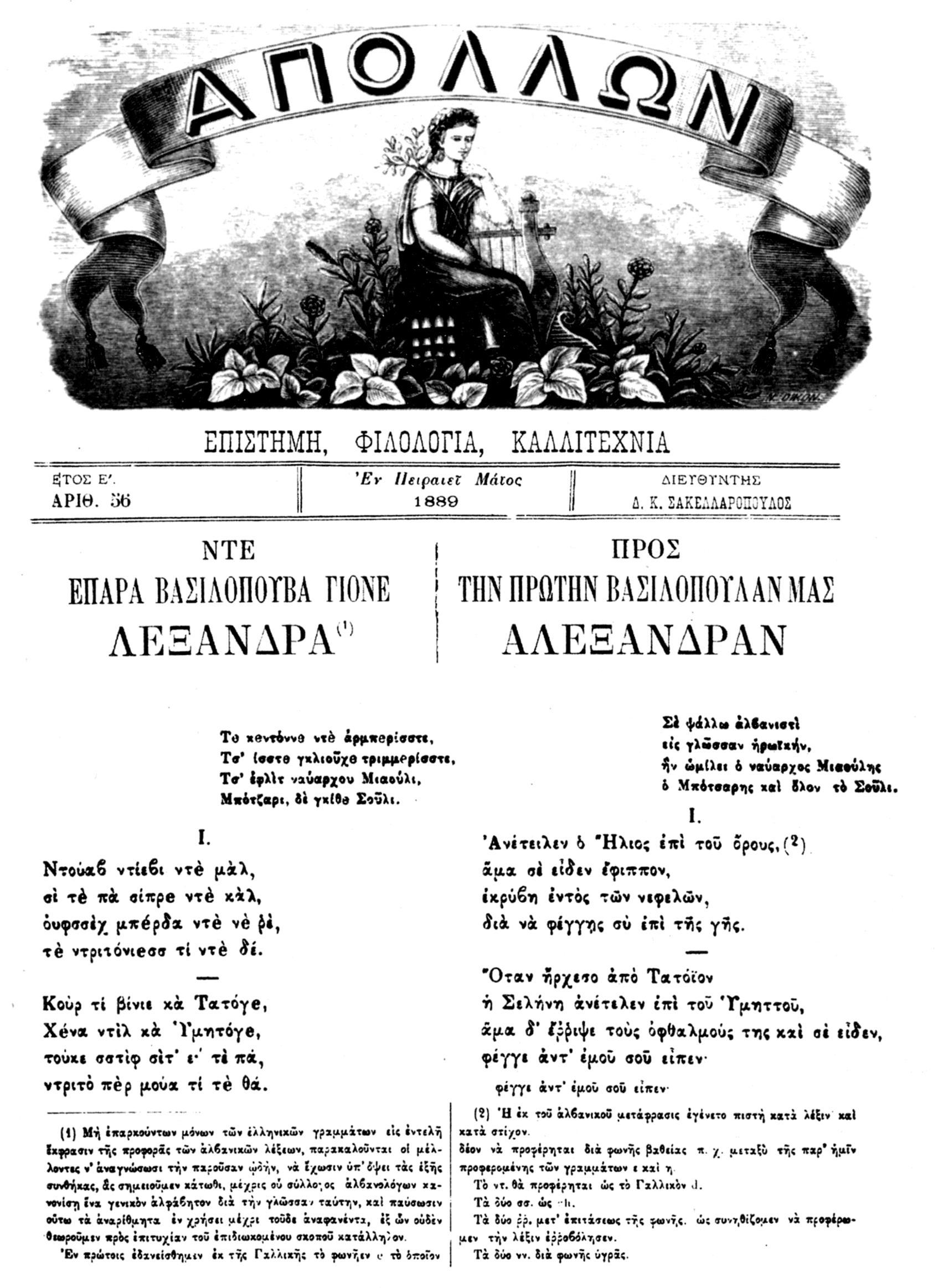
- Pronunciation: [aɾbəˈɾiʃt]
- Native to: Greece
- Region: Attica, Boeotia, South Euboea, Saronic Islands; Western Thrace; Peloponnese; some villages in NW of Greece; N of island of Andros; more than 500 villages in total
- Ethnicity: 150,000 Arvanites (2000)
- Native speakers: 50,000 (2007) (may be republished older data)
- Language family: Indo-European: Albanoid; Albanian; Tosk; Southern; Arvanitika
- Dialects: Viotia Arvanitika; Attiki Arvanitika; Salamina Arvanitika; Evia Arvanitika
- Writing system: Greek (Arvanitic alphabet); Latin

Language codes
- ISO 639-3: aat
- Glottolog: arva1236
- ELP: Arvanitika
- Linguasphere: 55-AAA-ae
- Distribution of Albanian language dialects.

- Arvanitika is classified as Severely Endangered by the UNESCO Atlas of the World's Languages in Danger

Arvanitika (/ˌɑːr.və.ˈnɪt.ɪ.kə/; Arvanitika: αρbε̰ρίσ̈τ, romanized: arbërisht [aɾbəˈɾiʃt]; Greek: αρβανίτικα, romanized: arvanítika), also known as Arvanitic, is the variety of Albanian traditionally spoken by the Arvanites, a population group in Greece. Arvanitika was brought to Southern Greece during the late Middle Ages by Albanian settlers who moved south from their homeland in present-day Albania in several waves. The dialect preserves elements of medieval Albanian, while also being significantly influenced by the Greek language. Arvanitika is today endangered, as its speakers have been shifting to the use of Greek and most younger members of the community no longer speak it.

== Name ==
The name Arvanítika and its native equivalent Arbërisht are derived from the ethnonym Arvanites, which in turn comes from the toponym Arbën or Arbër (Greek: Άρβανον), which in the Middle Ages referred to a region in modern Albania. Its native equivalents (Arbërorë, Arbëreshë and others) used to be the self-designation of Albanians in general. In the past Arvanitika had sometimes been described as "Graeco-Albanian" and the like (e.g., Furikis, 1934); although today many Arvanites consider such names offensive, they generally identify nationally and ethnically as Greeks and not Albanians.

== Classification ==
The place of Arvanitika within Albanian

Arvanitika is part of the Tosk dialect group of Albanian, and as such closely related to the varieties spoken across southern Albania. It is also closely related to Arbëresh, the dialect of Albanian in Italy, which largely goes back to Arvanite settlers from Greece. Italian Arbëresh has retained some words borrowed from Greek (for instance haristis 'thank you', from ευχαριστώ; dhrom 'road', from δρόμος; Ne 'yes', from ναι, in certain villages). Italo-Arbëresh and Graeco-Arvanitika have a mutually intelligible vocabulary base, the unintelligible elements of the two dialects stem from the usage of Italian or Greek modernisms in the absence of native ones. While linguistic scholarship unanimously describes Arvanitika as a dialect of Albanian many Arvanites are reported to dislike the use of the name "Albanian" to designate it.

Sociolinguistic work has described Arvanitika within the conceptual framework of "ausbausprachen" and "abstandssprachen". In terms of "abstand" (objective difference of the linguistic systems), linguists' assessment of the degree of mutual intelligibility between Arvanitika and Standard Tosk range from fairly high to only partial (Ethnologue). The Ethnologue also mentions that mutual intelligibility may even be problematic between different subdialects within Arvanitika. Mutual intelligibility between Standard Tosk and Arvanitika is higher than that between the two main dialect groups within Albanian, Tosk and Gheg. See below for a sample text in the three language forms. Trudgill (2004: 5) sums up that "[l]inguistically, there is no doubt that [Arvanitika] is a variety of Albanian".

In terms of "ausbau" (sociolinguistic "upgrading" towards an autonomous standard language), the strongest indicator of autonomy is the existence of a separate writing system, the Greek-based Arvanitic alphabet. A very similar system was formerly in use also by other Tosk Albanian speakers between the 16th and 18th century. However, this script is very rarely used in practice today, as Arvanitika is almost exclusively a spoken language confined to the private sphere. There is also some disagreement amongst Arvanites (as with the Aromanians) as to whether the Latin alphabet should be used to write their language. Spoken Arvanitika is internally richly diversified into sub-dialects, and no further standardization towards a common (spoken or written) Standard Arvanitika has taken place. At the same time, Arvanites do not use Standard Albanian as their standard language either, as they are generally not literate in the Latin-based standard Albanian orthography, and are not reported to use spoken-language media in Standard Albanian. In this sense, then, Arvanitika is not functionally subordinated to Standard Albanian as a dachsprache ("roof language"), in the way dialects of a national language within the same country usually are.

== Geographic distribution ==
Regions of Greece with a traditional presence of languages other than Greek. The green areas represent where Arvanitika was/is spoken.

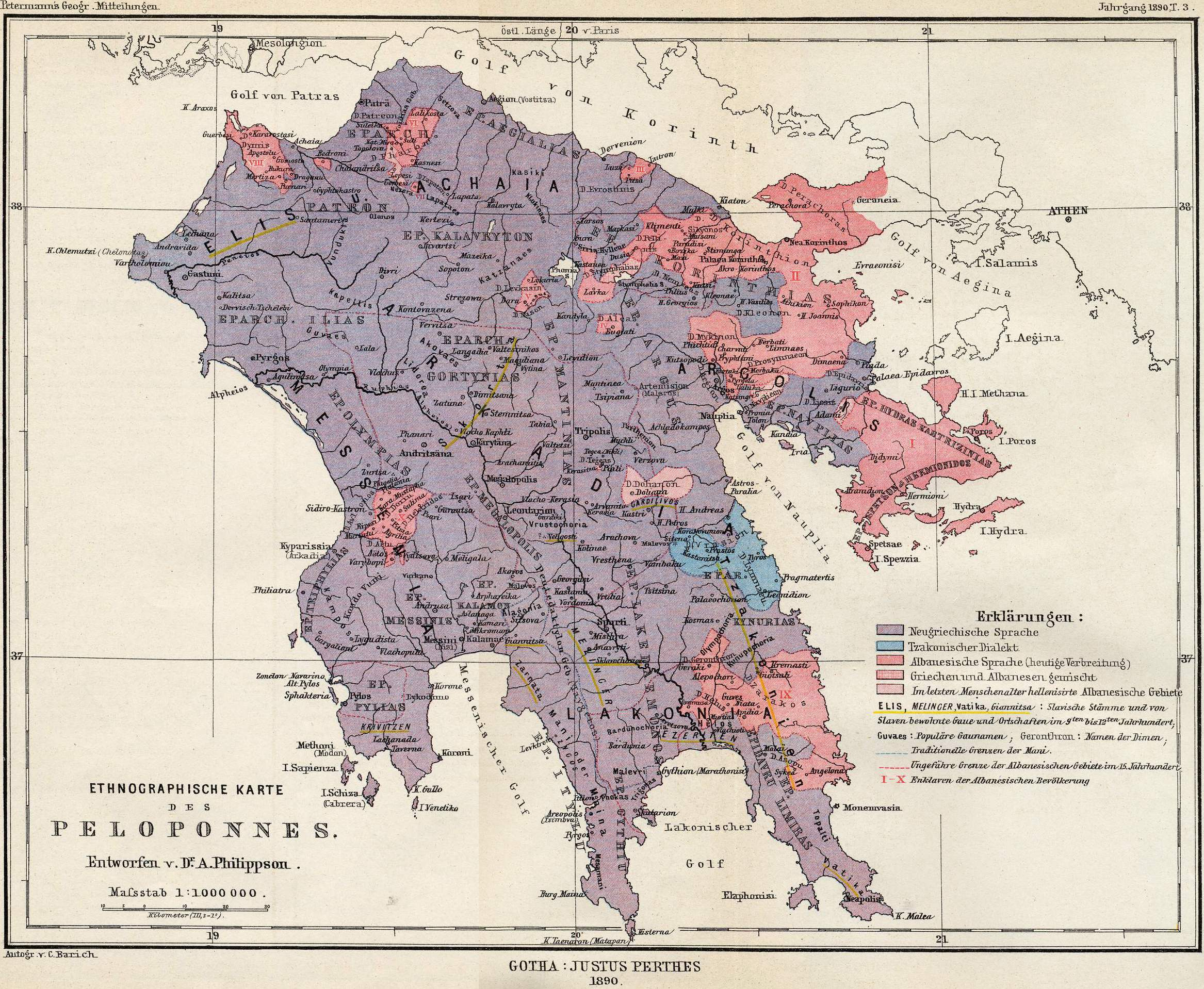
Nineteenth-century ethnic map of Peloponnese. Arvanitika-speaking areas in red.

There are three main groups of Arvanitic settlements in Greece. Most Arvanites live in the south of Greece, across Attica, Boeotia, the Peloponnese and some neighbouring areas and islands. A second, smaller group live in the northwest of Greece, in a zone contiguous with the Albanian-speaking lands proper. A third, outlying group is found in the northeast of Greece, in a few villages in Thrace.

According to some authors, the term "Arvanitika" in its proper sense applies only to the southern group or to the southern and the Thracian groups together i.e. to those dialects that have been separated from the core of Albanian for several centuries. The dialects in the northwest are reported to be more similar to neighbouring Tosk dialects within Albania and to the speech of the former Cham Albanians (Çamërishte), who used to live in the same region. These dialects are classified by Ethnologue as part of core Tosk Albanian, as opposed to "Arvanitika Albanian" in the narrow sense, although Ethnologue notes that the term "Arvanitika" is also often applied indiscriminately to both forms in Greece. In their own language, some groups in the north-west are reported to use the term Shqip (Albanian language) to refer to their own language as well as to that of Albanian nationals, and this has sometimes been interpreted as implying that they are ethnically Albanians. The Arvanitika of southern Greece is richly sub-divided into local dialects. Sasse (1991) distinguishes as many as eleven dialect groups within that area: West Attic, Southeast Attic, Northeast-Attic-Boeotian, West Boeotian, Central Boeotian, Northeast Peloponnesian, Northwest Peloponnesian, South Peloponnesian, West Peloponnesian, Euboean, and Andriote.

Estimated numbers of speakers of Arvanitika vary widely, between 30,000 and 150,000. These figures include "terminal speakers" (Tsitsipis 1998) of the younger generation, who have only acquired an imperfect command of the language and are unlikely to pass it on to future generations. The number of villages with traditional Arvanite populations is estimated to more than 500. There are no monolingual Arvanitika-speakers, as all are today bilingual in Greek. Arvanitika is considered an endangered language due to the large-scale language shift towards Greek in recent decades.

== Characteristics ==
Arvanitika shares many features with the Tosk dialect spoken in Southern Albania. However, it has received a great deal of influence from Greek, mostly related to the vocabulary and the phonological system. At the same time, it is reported to have preserved some conservative features that were lost in mainstream Albanian Tosk. For example, it has preserved certain syllable-initial consonant clusters which have been simplified in Standard Albanian (cf. Arvanitika gljuhë /ˈɡʎuxə/ ('language/tongue'), vs. Standard Albanian gjuhë /ˈɟuhə/).

In recent times, linguists have observed signs of accelerated structural convergence towards Greek and structural simplification of the language, which have been interpreted as signs of "language attrition", i.e. effects of impoverishment leading towards language death.

== Writing system ==
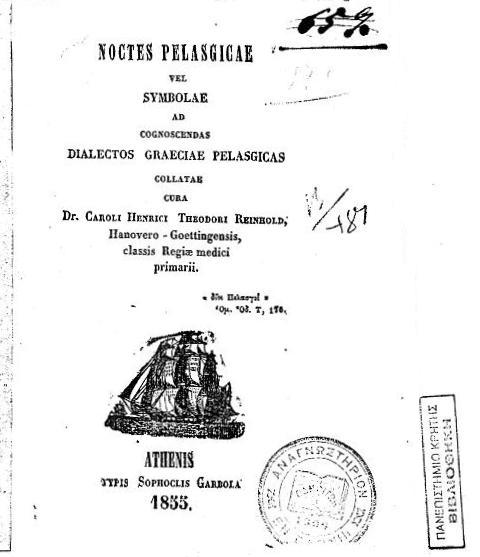
Noctes Pelasgicae, a collection of folk-songs, proverbs and lexical materials in Arbërishte, published by Karl Th. H. Reinhold.

Arvanitika has rarely been written. Reportedly, it has been written in both the Greek alphabet (often with the addition of the letters b, d, e and j, or diacritics, e.g. Ἀλφάβητον) and the Latin alphabet. Orthodox Tosk Albanians also used to write with a similar form of the Greek alphabet (e.g. Albanian-Greek).

Texts in Arvanitika have survived in the private correspondence between Arvanites who used the dialect. Such is the correspondence of Ioannis Orlandos with Georgios Kountouriotis and other letters by members of the Kountouriotis family written in the Arvanitika of Hydra with Greek script.

In public use, Arvanitika has been used in election pamphlets of Attica and Boeotia in the 19th century. These pamphlets were published in Greek and Arvanitika for the better propagation of party lines among Arvanites and to ease communication between non-Arvanite candidates who could not speak Arvanitika and Arvanite voters.

Arvanitic script
Arvanitic	Albanian	IPA
Α α	A a	/a/
Β β	V v	/v/
Ƃ/B b	B b	/b/
Γ γ	G g	/g/
Γ̇ γ̇/Γϳ γϳ	Gj gj	/ɟ/
Δ δ	Dh dh	/ð/
D d	D d	/d/
E ε	E e	/ɛ/
Ε̰ ε̰/E̱ ε̱	Ë ë	/ə/
Ζ ζ	Z z	/z/
Ζ̇ ζ̇	Zh zh	/ʒ/
Θ θ	Th th	/θ/
Ι ι	I i	/i/
Ϳ ϳ	J j	/j/
K κ	K k	/k/
K̇ κ̇	Q q	/c/
Λ λ	L l	/l/
Λλ λλ	Ll ll	/ɫ/
Λ̇ λ̇	Lj lj	/ʎ/
Μ μ	M m	/m/
Ν ν	N n	/n/
Ν̇ ν̇	Nj nj	/ɲ/
O o	O o	/ɔ/
Π π	P p	/p/
Ρ ρ	R r	/ɾ/
Ṗ ρ̇	Rr rr	/r/
Σ σ	S s	/s/
Σ̈ σ̈	Sh sh	/ʃ/
Τ τ	T t	/t/
ȣ ȣ	U u	/u/
Υ υ	Y y	/y/
Φ φ	F f	/f/
Χ χ	H h	/x/
Χ̇ χ̇	Hj hj	/xʲ/
Τσ τσ	C c	/t͡s/
Τσ̈ τσ̈	Ç ç	/t͡ʃ/
Dσ dσ	X x	/d͡z/
Dσ̈ dσ̈	Xh xh	/d͡ʒ/

== Language samples ==
=== Grammar ===
==== Pronouns ====
			Personal pronouns		Possessive pronouns	
1st person	singular		û	I	ími	mine
1st person	plural		ne	we	íni	ours
2nd person	singular		ti	you	íti	yours
2nd person	plural		ju	you	júai	yours
3rd person	singular	masc.	ái	he	atía	his
3rd person	singular	fem.	ajó	she	asája	hers
3rd person	plural	masc.	atá	they (M)	atíre	theirs
3rd person	plural	fem.	ató	they (F)	atíre	theirs

==== Verb paradigms ====
	The verb HAVE				The verb BE			
	PRES	IMPERF	SUBJ.IMPERF	SUBJ.PERF	PRES	IMPERF	SUBJ.IMPERF	SUBJ.PERF
1SG	kam	keshë	të kem	të keshë	jam	jeshë	të jem	të jeshë
2SG	ke	keshe	të kesh	të keshe	je	jeshe	të jesh	të jëshe
3SG	ka	kish	të ket	të kish	ishtë, është	ish	të jet	të ish
1PL	kemi	keshëm	të kemi	te keshëm	jemi	jeshëm	të jeshëm	të jeshëm
2PL	kine	keshëtë	të kini	te keshëtë	jini	jeshëtë	të jeshëtë	të jeshëtë
3PL	kanë	kishnë	të kenë	të kishnë	janë	ishnë	të jenë	të ishnë

==== Comparison with other forms of Albanian ====
The Lord's Prayer (Áti ýnë / Άτι ύνε̱) in Arvanitika
Arvanitika		Tosk	Gheg	Arbëresh	English
Áti ýnë që jé ndë qiéjet	Ãτι ύνε̱ κ̇ε̱ ϳέ νdε̱ κ̇ιέϳετ	Ati ynë që je në qiell	Ati ynë që je në qiell	Tata ghine cë jee në chiex	Our father who art in heaven
ushënjtëróft' émëri ýt	ȣσ̈ε̱ν̇τε̱ρόφτ' έμε̱ρι ύτ	u shenjtëroftë emri yt	shënjtnue kjoftë emni yt	schetruarë clost embri ghit	hallowed be thy name
árthtë mbëretëría jóte	άρθτε̱ μbε̱ρετε̱ρία ϳότε	arthtë mbretëria jote	ardhtë m(b)retënia jote	jar reghria jòte (jar mbretëria jòte)	thy kingdom come
ubëftë dashurími ýt	ȣbε̱φτε̱ dασ̈ȣρίμι ύτ	u bëftë dashurimi yt (u bëftë vullnesa jote)	u baftë dashnimi yt (u baftë vullneti yt)	bûrë clost vulema jùte	thy will be done
si ndë qiél, edhé mbë dhét	σι νdε̱ κ̇ιέl, εδέ μbε̱ δέτ	si në qiell, edhe mbi dhe (si në qiell, ashtu në tokë)	si në qiell, edhe m(b)y dheu (si në qiell, ashtu në tokë)	si në chiext, astu në dee	on earth, as it is in heaven
búkënë tónë të përdítëshimen'	bȣ́κε̱νε̱ τόνε̱ τε̱ πε̱ρdίτε̱σ̈ιμεν'	bukën tonë të përditëshme	bukën tonë të përditshmen	bucnë tënë tëdiscmen	our daily bread
ép-na néve sót	έπ-να νέβε σότ	na e jep sot	epna neve sod	emna sòt	give us this day
edhé fálj-na fájetë tóna	εδέ φάλ̇-να φάϳετε̱ τόνα	edhe na i fal fajet tona	edhë falna fajët tona	e ndiena meatëtë tona	and forgive us our trespasses
sikúndrë edhé néve ua fáljmë	σικȣ́νdρε̱ εδέ νέβε ȣα φάλ̇με̱	sikundër edhe ne i falim	sikur edhe na ua falim	si (e) na ndicgnëmi	as we forgive those who
fajtórëvet tánë	φαϳτόρε̱βετ τάνε̱	fajtorët tanë	fajtorëvet tanë	armikete tënë	trespass against us
edhé mos na shtiér ndë ngásie	εδέ μοσ να σ̈τιέρ νdε̱ νγάσιε	edhe mos na shtjerë në ngasje (edhe mos na ler të biem në tundim)	e mos na shtinë në t'keq	etë mòj bieme ën pirasmô	and lead us not into temptation
pó shpëtó-na nga i ljígu	πό σ̈πε̱τό-να νγα ι λ̇ίγȣ	por shpëtona nga i ligu (por na liro nga i keqi)	po largona prej të keqit	ma lirona caa ghiet eliga	but deliver us from evil
sepsé jótia është mbëretëría	σεπσέ ϳότια ε̱σ̈τε̱ μbε̱ρετε̱ρία	sepse jotja është mbretëria	sepse e jotja âsht mretnia		for thine is the kingdom
e fuqía e ljavdía	ε φȣκ̇ία ε λ̇αβdία	e fuqia e lavdia	e fuqia e lavdia		and the power and the glory
ndë jétët të jétëvet.	νdε̱ ϳέτε̱τ τε̱ ϳέτε̱βετ.	në jetët të jetëvet.	në jetët të jetëvet.		for ever and ever.
Amín.	Αμίν.	Ashtu qoftë.	Ashtu kjoftë.	Astu-clost.	Amen.

=== Some common phrases ===
Flet fare arbërisht?	Do you speak Arvanitika at all?
Flas shumë pak.	I speak very little.
Je mirë?	Are you well?
Jam shumë mirë.	I am very well.
Çë bën, je mir?	How do you do?.
Si jam? Shum mir.	How am I doing? Very well, thanks.
Ti si je?	What about you?
Edhé un jam shum mir.	I'm fine, too.
Si ishtë it at?	How is your father?
Edhé aj isht shum mir.	He's doing fine.
Thuai të faljtura.	Give him my best regards.
Gruaja jote si ishtë?	How about your wife?
Nani edhe ajo, ishtë mir, i shkoi sëmunda çë kej.	Now she too is ok, the sickness is over.
T'i thuash tët atë, po do, të vemi nestrë të presmë dru, të më thret.	Tell your father, if he wants to go tomorrow to cut wood let him call me.

== Bibliography ==
- Babiniotis, Georgios (1985): Συνοπτική Ιστορία της ελληνικής γλώσσας με εισαγωγή στην ιστορικοσυγκριτική γλωσσολογία. ["A concise history of the Greek language, with an introduction to historical-comparative linguistics"] Athens: Ellinika Grammata.
- Babiniotis, Georgios (1998), Λεξικό της Νέας Ελληνικής Γλώσσας ["Dictionary of Modern Greek"]. Athens: Kentro Lexikologias.
- Banfi, Emanuele (1994): "Minorités linguistiques en Grèce: Langues cachées, idéologie nationale, religion." ["Linguistic minorities in Greece: Hidden languages, national ideology, religion."] Paper presented at the Mercator Program Seminar at the Maison des Sciences de l' Homme, on 6 June 1994, in Paris.
- Banfi, Emanuele (1996), "Minoranze linguistiche in Grecia: problemi storico- e sociolinguistici" ["Linguistic minorities in Greece: Historical and sociolinguistic problems"]. In: C. Vallini (ed.), Minoranze e lingue minoritarie: convegno internazionale. Naples: Universitario Orientale. 89–115.
- Botsi, Eleni (2003): Die sprachliche Selbst- und Fremdkonstruktion am Beispiel eines arvanitischen Dorfes Griechenlands: Eine soziolinguistische Studie. ("Linguistic construction of the self and the other in an Arvanite village in Greece: A sociolinguistic study"). PhD dissertation, University of Konstanz, Germany. Online text
- Breu, Walter (1990): "Sprachliche Minderheiten in Italien und Griechenland." ["Linguistic minorities in Italy and Greece"]. In: B. Spillner (ed.), Interkulturelle Kommunikation. Frankfurt: Lang. 169–170.
- Euromosaic (1996): "L'arvanite / albanais en Grèce". Report published by the Institut de Sociolingüística Catalana. Online version
- Furikis, Petros (1934): "Η εν Αττική ελληνοαλβανική διάλεκτος". ["The Greek-Albanian dialect in Attica"] Αθήνα 45: 49–181.
- GHM (=Greek Helsinki Monitor) (1995): "Report: The Arvanites". Online report
- Haebler, Claus (1965): Grammatik der albanischen Mundarten von Salamis. ["Grammar of the Albanian dialects of Salamis"]. Wiesbaden: Harassowitz.
- Hammarström, Harald (2005): Review of Ethnologue: Languages of the World, 15th Edition. LINGUIST List 16.2637 (5 Sept 2005). Online article
- Joseph, Brian D. "Comparative perspectives on the place of Arvanitika within Greece and the Greek environment", 1999, pp. 208–214 in L. Tsitsipis (ed.), Arvanitika ke Elinika: Zitimata Poliglosikon ke Polipolitismikon Kinotiton Vol. II. Livadia: Exandas, 1999 PDF.
- Η Καινή Διαθήκη στα Αρβανίτικα: Διάτα ε Ρε ['The New Testament in Arvanitika']. Athens: Ekdoseis Gerou. No date.
- Kloss, Heinz (1967): "Abstand-languages and Ausbau-languages". Anthropological linguistics 9.
- Salminen, Tapani (1993–1999): Unesco Red Book on Endangered Languages: Europe..
- Sasse, Hans-Jürgen (1985): "Sprachkontakt und Sprachwandel: Die Gräzisierung der albanischen Mundarten Griechenlands" ["Language contact and language change: The Hellenization of the Albanian dialects of Greece"]. Papiere zur Linguistik 32(1). 37–95.
- Sasse, Hans-Jürgen (1991): Arvanitika: Die albanischen Sprachreste in Griechenland. ["Arvanitika: The Albanian language relics in Greece"]. Wiesbaden.
- Sasse, Hans-Jürgen (1992): "Theory of language death". In: M. Brenzinger (ed.), Language death: Factual and theoretical explorations with special reference to East Africa. Berlin: Mouton de Gruyter. 7–30.
- Sella-Mazi, Eleni (1997): "Διγλωσσία και ολιγώτερο ομιλούμενες γλώσσες στην Ελλάδα" ["Diglossia and lesser-spoken languages in Greece"]. In: K. Tsitselikis, D. Christopoulos (eds.), Το μειονοτικό φαινόμενο στην Ελλάδα ["The minority phenomenon in Greece"]. Athens: Ekdoseis Kritiki. 349–413.
- Strauss, Dietrich (1978): "Scots is not alone: Further comparative considerations". Actes du 2^{e} Colloque de langue et de littérature écossaises Strasbourg 1978. 80–97.
- Thomason, Sarah G. (2001): Language contact: An introduction. Washington: Georgetown University Press. Online chapter
- Trudgill, Peter (1976–77): "Creolization in reverse: reduction and simplification in the Albanian dialects of Greece", Transactions of the Philological Society, 32–50.
- Trudgill, Peter (2004): "Glocalisation [sic] and the Ausbau sociolinguistics of modern Europe". In: A. Duszak, U. Okulska (eds.), Speaking from the margin: Global English from a European perspective. Frankfurt: Peter Lang. Online article
- Trudgill, Peter, George A. Tzavaras (1977): "Why Albanian-Greeks are not Albanians: Language shift in Attika and Biotia." In: H. Giles (ed.), Language, ethnicity and intergroup relations. London: Academic Press. 171–184.
- Tsitsipis, Lukas (1981): Language change and language death in Albanian speech communities in Greece: A sociolinguistic study. PhD dissertation, University of Wisconsin, Madison.
- Tsitsipis, Lukas (1983): "Language shift among the Albanian speakers of Greece." Anthropological Linguisitcs 25(3): 288–308.
- Tsitsipis, Lukas (1995): "The coding of linguistic ideology in Arvanitika (Albanian): Language shift, congruent and contradictory discourse." Anthropological Linguistics 37: 541–577.
- Tsitsipis, Lukas (1998a): Αρβανίτικα και Ελληνικά: Ζητήματα πολυγλωσσικών και πολυπολιτισμικών κοινοτήτων. ["Arvanitika and Greek: Issues of multilingual and multicultural communities"]. Vol. 1. Livadeia.
- Tsitsipis, Lukas (1998b): A Linguistic Anthropology of Praxis and Language Shift: Arvanitika (Albanian) and Greek in Contact. Oxford: Oxford University Press. ISBN 0-19-823731-6. (Review by Alexander Rusakov on Linguist List.)
- The bilingual New Testament: Η Καινή Διαθήκη του Κυρίου και Σωτήρος ημών Ιησού Χριστού Δίγλωττος τουτέστι Γραικική και Αλβανιτική. Dhjata e re e Zotit sonë që na shpëtoi, Iisu Hrishtoit mbë di gjuhë, do me thënë gërqishte e dhe shqipëtarçe. Επιστασία Γρηγορίου Αρχιεπισκόπου της Ευβοίας. Κορφοί. Εν τη τυπογραφία της Διοικήσεως. 1827
