= Ano Fanari =

Ano Fanari Άνω Φανάρι
- Community
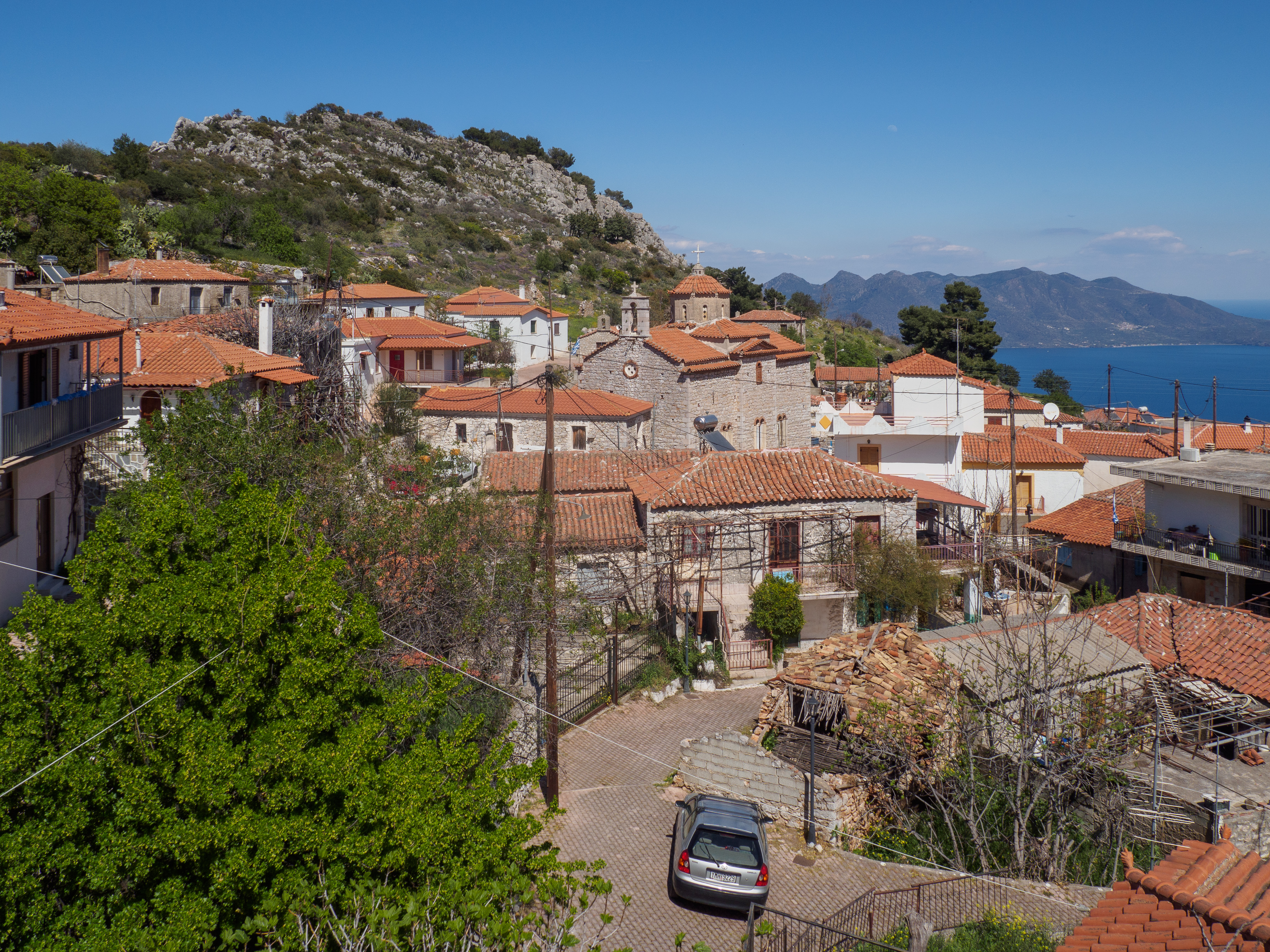
- View of the village

- Location within Greece
- Coordinates: 37°34.3′N 23°13.3′E
- Country: Greece
- Administrative region: Attica
- Regional unit: Islands
- Municipality: Troizinia-Methana
- Municipal unit: Troizina

Population (2021)
  - Community: 218
- Time zone: UTC+2 (EET)
  - Summer (DST): UTC+3 (EEST)
- Postal code: 180 80
- Area code: 22980

Ano Fanari (Greek: Άνω Φανάρι) is a mountain village belonging to the Troizinia-Methana municipality in northeastern Peloponnese, Greece. A small acropolis rises above Ano Fanari. It is situated on the old road from Galatas to Agia Eleni and Epidavros.

== Historical population ==
Year	Population
1981	391
1991	182
2001	361
2011	287
2021	218

== See also ==
- List of settlements in Attica, including the Troizina area
