= Kounoupitsa =

Kounoupitsa Κουνουπίτσα
- Community
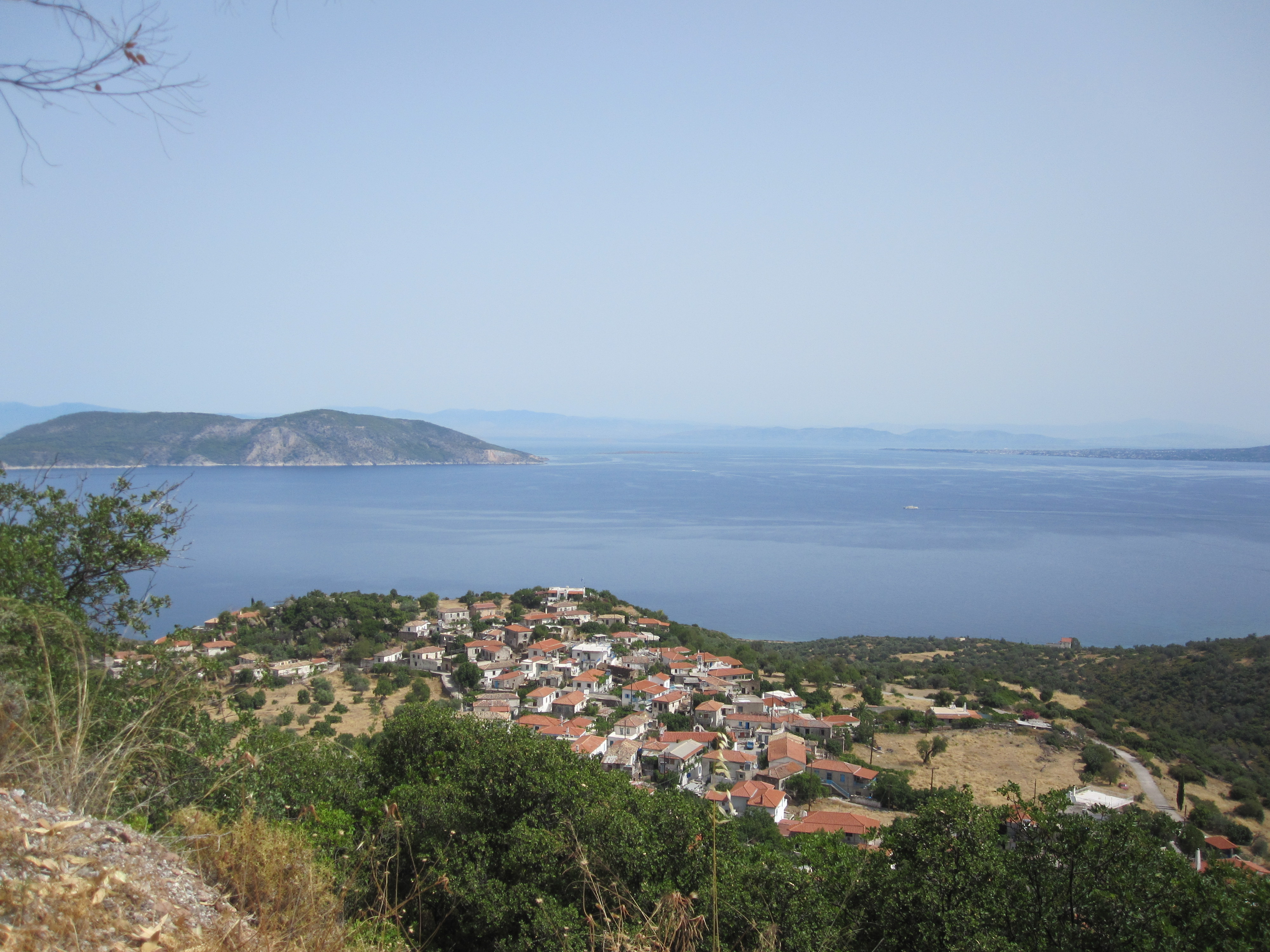
- View of Kounoupitsa

- Location within Greece
- Coordinates: 37°37.9′N 23°22.5′E
- Country: Greece
- Administrative region: Attica
- Regional unit: Islands
- Municipality: Troizinia-Methana
- Municipal unit: Methana

Population (2021)
  - Community: 128
- Time zone: UTC+2 (EET)
  - Summer (DST): UTC+3 (EEST)

Kounoupitsa (Greek: Κουνουπίτσα) is a village and a community in the northern end of the Methana peninsula, northeastern Peloponnese, Greece. It is part of the municipality Troizinia-Methana. The community consists of the villages Kounoupitsa, Agios Georgios, Agios Nikolaos, Makrylongos and Palaia Loutra. The population of the community at the 2021 census was 128. Agios Nikolaos is known for its volcanic hot springs.

== Historical population ==
Census	Settlement	Community
1991	152	
2001	136	163
2011	75	178
2021	69	128

== See also ==
- List of settlements in Attica
