= Kypseli, Methana =

Kypseli Κυψέλη
- Community
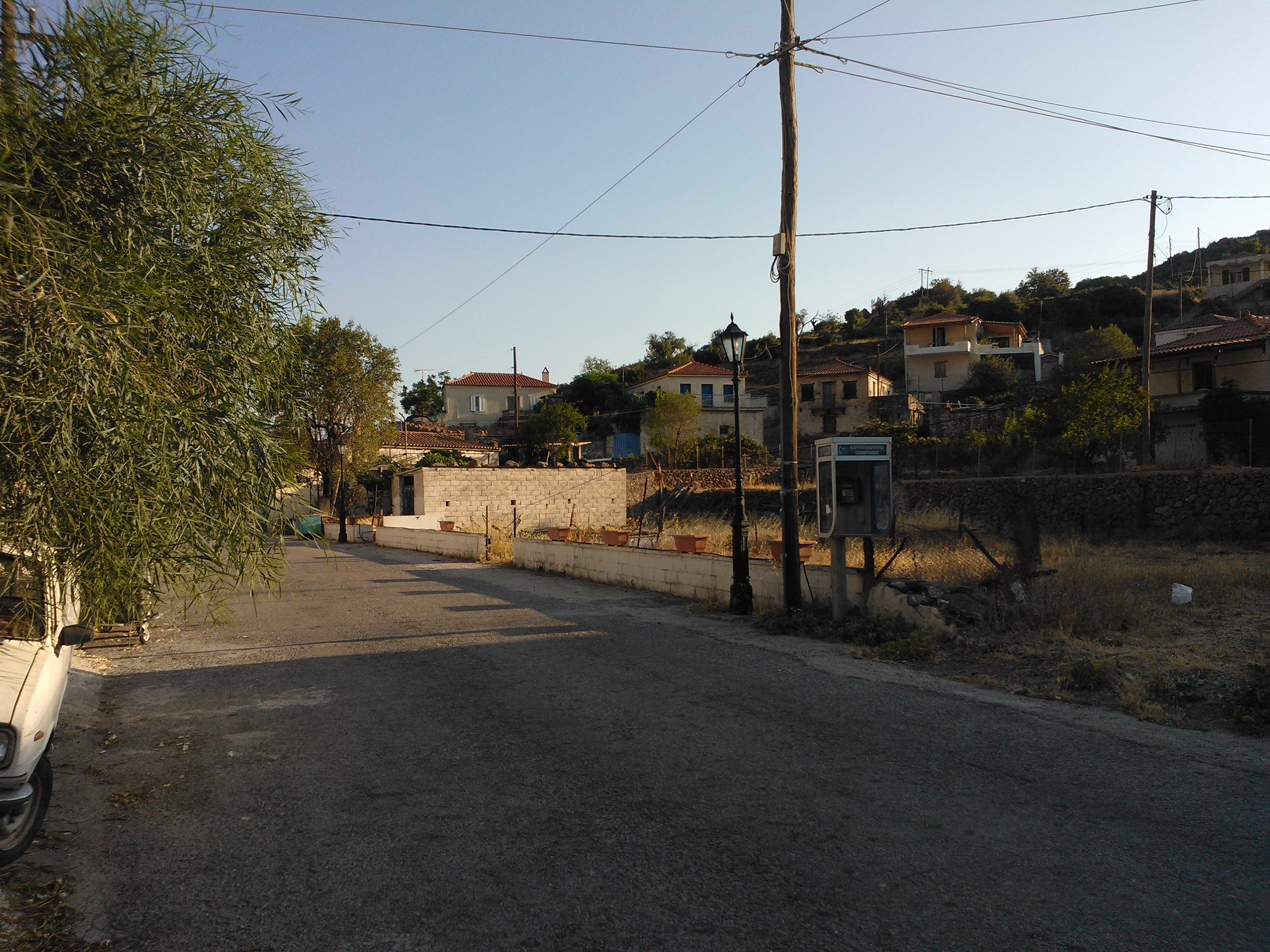
- The village Kypseli

- Location within Greece
- Coordinates: 37°36′N 23°23′E
- Country: Greece
- Administrative region: Attica
- Regional unit: Islands
- Municipality: Troizinia-Methana
- Municipal unit: Methana
- Elevation: 240 m (790 ft)

Population (2021)
  - Community: 65
- Time zone: UTC+2 (EET)
  - Summer (DST): UTC+3 (EEST)
- Postal code: 180 30
- Area code: 22980

Kypseli (Greek: Κυψέλη) is situated in the eastern part of the Methana volcanic peninsula. It was originally a farming village. The older name of the village is Kosona. Kypseli community comprises also the village Agioi Theodoroi. The population of the community is 65 inhabitants according to 2021 census.

== Historical population ==
Census	Settlement	Community
1991	108	
2001	94	169
2011	47	92
2021	36	65
