= Fanar =

Fanar

- Fanar (Matn), village situated in Lebanon
- Fanar, Qatar Islamic Cultural Center, cultural organization in Doha, Qatar
- Fener, neighborhood in Istanbul

== See also ==
- Fanari (disambiguation)
- Fânari (disambiguation)
