= Methana =

Town in the Peloponnese, Greece

Methana Μέθανα
- Municipal unit
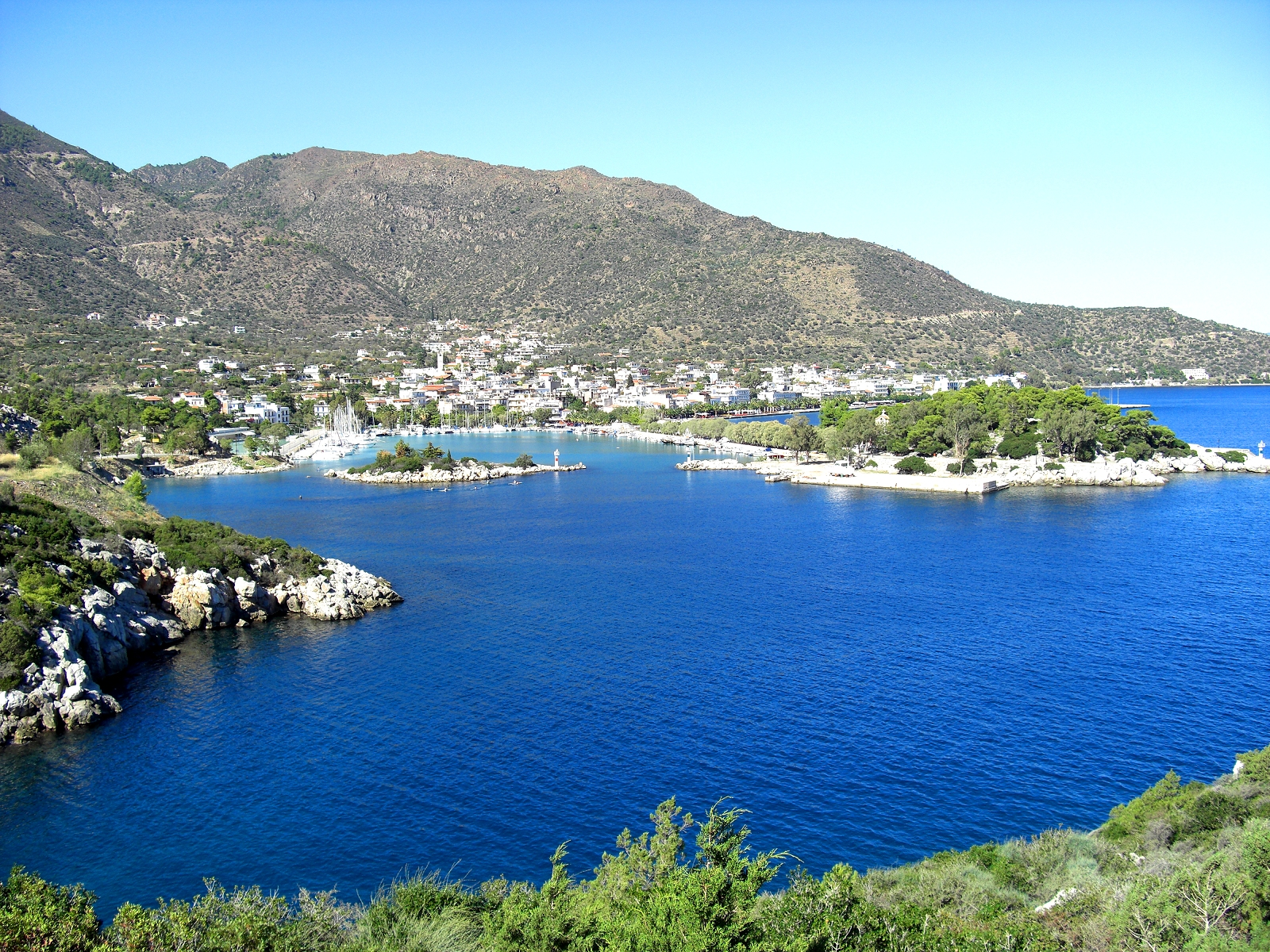
- Town of Methana

- Location within the regional unit

- Location within Greece
- Coordinates: 37°34′N 23°23′E
- Country: Greece
- Geographic region: Peloponnese
- Administrative region: Attica
- Regional unit: Islands
- Municipality: Troizinia-Methana
- Districts: 4

Area
  - Municipal unit: 50.161 km^{2} (19.367 sq mi)
- Elevation: 18 m (59 ft)

Population (2021)
  - Municipal unit: 1,352
  - Municipal unit density: 26.95/km^{2} (69.81/sq mi)
- Time zone: UTC+2 (EET)
  - Summer (DST): UTC+3 (EEST)
- Postal code: 180 30
- Area code: 22980
- Website: www.methana.gr

Methana (Greek: Μέθανα, Méthana) is a town and a former municipality on the Peloponnese peninsula, Greece. Since the 2011 local government reform it is part of the municipality Troizinia-Methana, of which it is a municipal unit. The municipal unit has an area of 50.161 km^{2}.

Methana is situated on a volcanic (the Methana Volcano) peninsula, attached to the Peloponnese. Administratively, it belongs to the Attica region. The town (pop. 892 in 2011) is located north of the road connecting to the rest of the Peloponnese and Galatas. The highest point is 740 metres (2,428 feet) (Helona Mountain). The municipal unit has a land area of 50.161 square kilometres (19.367 square miles) and a population of 1,352 inhabitants at the 2021 census.

== Subdivisions ==
The municipal unit Methana is subdivided into the following communities (constituent villages in brackets):

- Kounoupitsa (Kounoupitsa, Agios Georgios, Agios Nikolaos, Makrylongos, Palaia Loutra)
- Kypseli (Kypseli, Agioi Theodoroi)
- Loutropoli Methanon (Methana, Dritsaiika)
- Megalochori (Megalochori, Vathy, Kaimeni Chora, Megalo Potami)

== Historical population ==
Year	Community population	Municipal unit population
1981	1,035	-
1991	1,054	2,056
2001	1,148	2,057
2011	1,097	1,657
2021	899	1,352

Half of the entire peninsula's population lives in Methana town.

== Volcanic activity ==
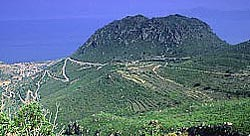
Methana Volcano

The peninsula is entirely of volcanic origin and contains over 30 volcanic eruption centers. The last volcanic eruption occurred near present-day Kameni Chora in 3rd century BC. Famous writers such as Ovid, Strabo and Pausanias reported the last volcanic eruption in Methana. The peninsula is the northwesternmost of the arc of the Aegean islands of which the active volcanic areas are Methana, Milos, Santorini and Nisyros. In the future, Methana (and the area of the Saronic gulf) may expect other volcanic eruptions.

== Geography ==
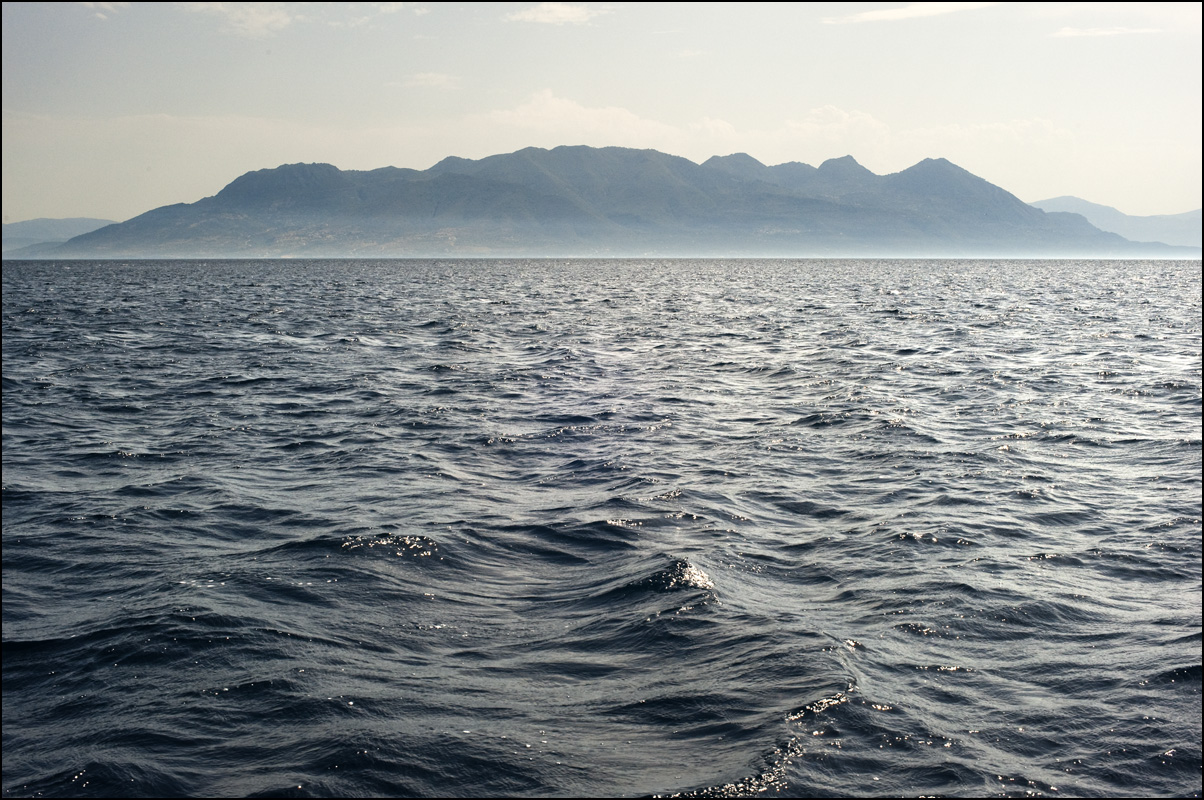
View of Methana peninsula from the sea

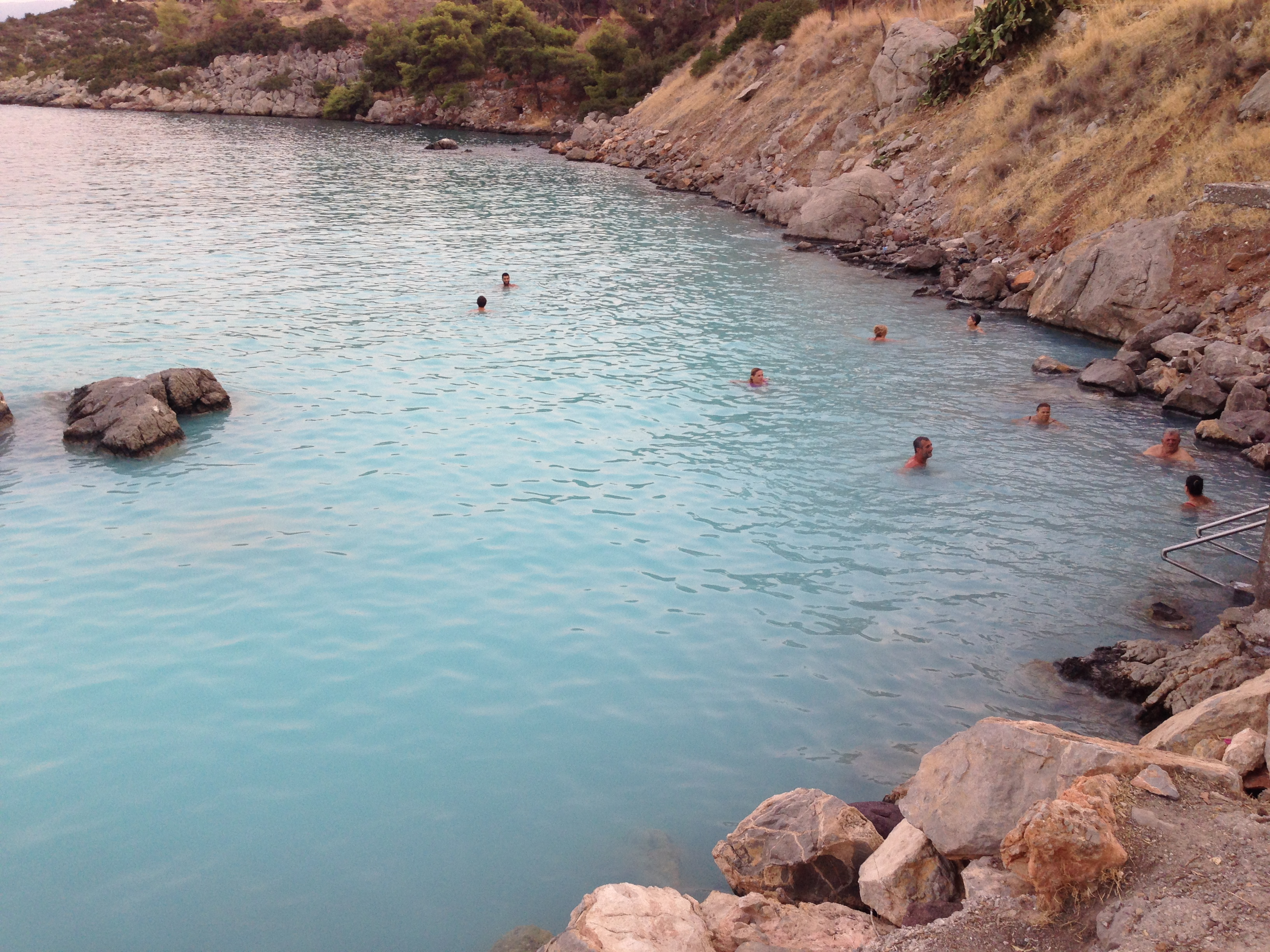
Sulfurous bath inside sea

Since 1991, the peninsula has been investigated by the team of ETH Zürich geologically and cartographically. From this, a topographical map of the entire peninsula at a scale of 1:25,000 was made. An interactive 3D map was created and is on the World Wide Web. Also a rich photographic archive with about 10.000 color slides has been produced (see links below).

The panorama of the northeastern part of Argolis, southeastern and eastern Corinthia along with the southern part of the Attica peninsula and the Saronic Islands of Aegina and Salamis along with a smaller one and the mountains of the eastern tip of the neighboring peninsula.

Much of the peninsula is mountainous and bushy and grassy. The mountain range covers the central part of the peninsula and has a small ridge north of the seat. The residential area is within the sea. The pastures are around Methana. A mountain ridge is founded in the west and is about 3 km (2 mi) long with a stream in the middle and a cliff in the south.

== History ==
The earliest known settlement (near the village of Vathy) dates from 1500–1300 BC. The first survey was conducted by Michael Deffner, who discovered a large throne, among other artefacts. Many ancient sites were identified through the archaeological survey conducted in the 1980s by the University of Liverpool in association with the British School at Athens. The Acropolis Palaiokastro is located near the village of Vathy but the main port is at Methana, also called Arsinoe in Ptolemaic times, with a fort on the islet of Nisaki. A coastal fortress called Akropolis Oga is located near Kypseli. A Mycenaean settlement was excavated by Helene Konstolakis-Jiannopoulou in 1990 along with the chapel of Agios Konstantinos and Elenis. Selected artifacts can be visited in the museums of Poros island and in Piraeus. This site dates between 1500 and 1300 BC. The name of the town appears to be in the so-called "Aegean List" from the Mortuary Temple of Amenhotep III in Egypt, dating to 14th century BCE, where it is recorded as m-dj-n-ij.

Methana (Ancient Greek: τὰ Μέθανα, tà Méthana), Methone (Μεθώνη, Methṓnē), or Methene (Μεθήνη, Methḗnē) was in the territory of Troezen. In his History of the Peloponnesian War, Thucydides tells of an Athenian expeditionary force under Nicias that after defeating Corinth (in 425 BC) built a wall across the isthmus to cut the Methana peninsula off from the mainland. In the Hellenistic period, the peninsula became one of the Ptolemaic bases in the Aegean when it was renamed Arsinoe. When Pausanias visited in the 2nd century, he saw a temple of Isis, and statutes of Hermes and Heracles in the agora.

There are no written references to Methana in the Byzantine and Ottoman periods. Ruins of basilicas and churches from the late 6th or early 7th century have been found. It seems that there were two settlements in Methana in the Byzantine period, one at Panagitsa and another at Prophet Elias and at Helona. Another settlement seems to have existed west of Kounoupitsa, where the church of Agia Barbara is located and the churches of Agios Dimitrios and Agios Ioannis the Theologian, built in the 13th century and frescoed, are located. It seems that the peninsula was not affected by Slavic invasions, but later in medieval times it was affected by raids. During the 14th century, a period in which the population of the region was diluted, Arvanites settled on the Methana peninsula.

During the Greek War of Independence, hundreds of refugees, mainly women and children, found refuge in the sparsely populated peninsula of Methana, so that the population of Methana rose from 500-600 in the pre-revolution years to 1,349 in 1830. In 1826-27 Charles Fabvier built a fortress on the isthmus of Methana, probably to protect his troops. In 1834 Methana became a municipality which was annexed to the province of Kalavria, consisting of the municipalities of Methana, Troizina, Dryopi and Kalavria.

== Notable people ==
- Giorgos Batis (1885–1967) singer
- Lina Nikolakopoulou

== See also ==
- List of settlements in Attica
