= Michael H. Jameson =

Michael Hamilton Jameson (15 October 1924 in London – 18 August 2004) was a classicist. At the time of his death he was Crossett Professor Emeritus of Humanistic Studies at Stanford University.

His father, Raymond D. Jameson, professor of Western literature at the University of Peking, and mother, Rose Perel Jameson, were visiting London at the time of his birth. He spent his childhood in Beijing and with his mother in London, received his A.B. in Greek at the University of Chicago in 1942, aged seventeen, served in the U.S. Navy as a Japanese translator, 1943–46, then married Virginia Broyles. He received his Ph.D. at Chicago in 1949, with a dissertation on "The Offering at Meals: Its Place in Greek Sacrifice". A Fulbright Fellowship in 1949 supported him at the American School of Classical Studies at Athens, where he hiked the Peloponnesos with his new wife and gained an intimate knowledge of inscriptions. After a brief stint at the University of Missouri, he accepted a Ford Fellowship at the Institute for Social Anthropology at Oxford University. On his return to the United States, be began his long association with the University of Pennsylvania (1954–76).

Though a spirit of perfectionism inhibited his production of an overarching book, in some sixty articles he explored the setting of Greek religion in its specific locality and time, thus focusing on unravelling the details of cult and ritual sacrifice; he did a great deal of work on epigraphy and its relations with literature and history, and he explored Greek sites, especially at the partly drowned port city of Halieis (Porto Cheli), which he began excavating in 1962, and in the Argolid, where he galvanized a broad ecological study, 1979–83, that was the first examination of the paleoecology of ancient Greece, resulting in the publication of M. H. Jameson, Tjeerd van Andel and C. N. Runnels, A Greek Countryside: The Southern Argolid from Prehistory to the Present Day (Stanford University Press) 1994.

His single most dramatic discovery was of a copy of the Decree of Themistocles, mobilizing early preparations for the evacuation of Attica before the Battle of Salamis (480 BCE), which he recognized in a kapheneion (a Greek café) in Troezen and copied in a squeeze. The discovery, which adjusted the historian's view drawn from Herodotus, elicited extensive literature, including four articles by Jameson, setting the text in its historical context and debating its essential authenticity.

He received numerous awards and visiting fellowships, including a Guggenheim Fellowship in 1966–67, and inspired a generation of scholars through his teaching. He was an elected member of both the American Academy of Arts and Sciences (1968) and the American Philosophical Society (1973). He died of cancer, at the age of 79, in 2004.

== Selected publications ==
Jameson contributed popular articles to encyclopedias: "Greek Mythology" in N. Kramer, The Mythologies of the Ancient World 1961, and "Mythology, Classical" in Collier's Encyclopedia 17 (1995:115-17).

His articles are widely scattered.

- "The Hero Echetlaeus", Transactions of the American Philological Association 82, (1951:49-61)
- Translation of Sophocles’ The Women of Trachis (1957)
- "Mycenaean religion", Archaeology 13 (1960)
- "A Decree of Themistokles from Troizen", Hesperia 19 (1960:198–223)
- "Notes on the sacrificial calendar from Erchia", Bulletin de correspondance. hellénique 89 (1965:154-72)
- "The mysteries of Eleusis", Bulletin of the Philadelphia Association for Psychoanalysis 19 (September 1969)
- "The Excavation of a Drowned Greek Temple", Scientific American (October 1972:74–91).
- "Sacrifice and animal husbandry in Classical Greece," C.R. Whittaker, ed.Pastoral Economies in Classical Antiquity, Cambridge Philological Society, suppl. 14 (1988:87–119)
- "Perseus, the Hero of Mykenai", in Celebrations of Death and Divinity in the Bronze Age Argolid, edited by R. Hägg and G.C. Nordquist, 1990
- "Sacrifice before Battle", in Hoplites: The Classical Greek Battle Experience, V.D. Hanson, ed. (1991:197–227)
- "The asexuality of Dionysus", in Masks of Dionysus Thomas H. Carpenter and Christopher A. Faraone, eds.. (Ithaca: Cornell University Press) (1993).
- "The Ritual of the Athena Nike Parapet", in Ritual, Finance, Politics. Athenian Democratic Accounts Presented to David Lewis. Robin Osborne and Simon Hornblower, eds. (Oxford:Clarendon Press) (1994:307-324). ISBN 978-0-19-814992-7
