= Megalochori =

Megalochori (Greek: Μεγαλοχώρι) may refer to the following places in Greece:

- Megalochori, a village on Agkistri, Saronic islands
- Megalochori, Methana, a village in the Methana peninsula
- Megalochori, Lesbos, a village in the municipal unit Plomari, Lesbos
- Megalochori, Santorini, a village in the island of Santorini in the Cyclades
- Megalochori, Serres, a village in the Serres regional unit
- Megalochori, Trikala, a village in the Trikala regional unit
