= Megalochori, Methana =

Megalochori Μεγαλοχώρι
- Community
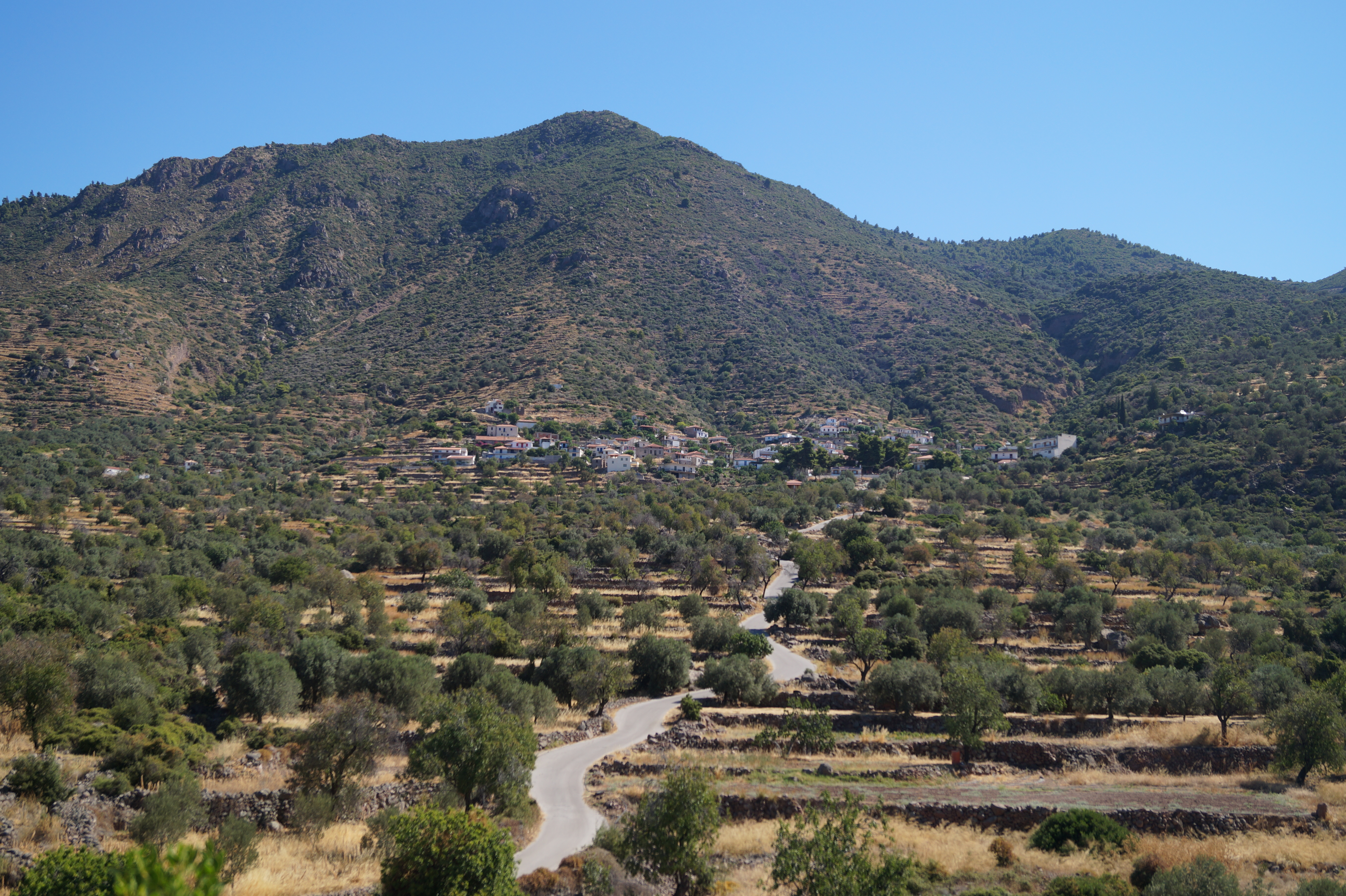

- Location within Greece
- Coordinates: 37°35.5′N 23°21.3′E
- Country: Greece
- Administrative region: Attica
- Regional unit: Islands
- Municipality: Troizinia-Methana
- Municipal unit: Methana
- Elevation: 113 m (371 ft)

Population (2021)
  - Community: 260
- Time zone: UTC+2 (EET)
  - Summer (DST): UTC+3 (EEST)
- Postal code: 180 30
- Area code: 22980

Megalochori (Greek: Μεγαλοχώρι) is a village and a community in the western part of the volcanic Methana peninsula, Greece. It is located 3 km northwest of Methana town. The community consists of the villages Megalochori, Vathy, Kaimeni Chora and Megalo Potami. The ancient Acropolis of Methana, which was described by Pausanias, is located near Megalochori.

== Methana Volcano ==
Near Megalochori is located the village Kameni Chora. In this place, the last volcanic eruption of Methana Volcano happened between 277 and 240 B.C., during the times of Antigonus Gonatas, king of Macedonia.

== Historical population ==
Year	Village population	Community population
1981	—	437
1991	226	—
2001	167	413
2011	115	290
2021	92	260
