= Galatas, Troizina =

Galatas Γαλατάς
- Community
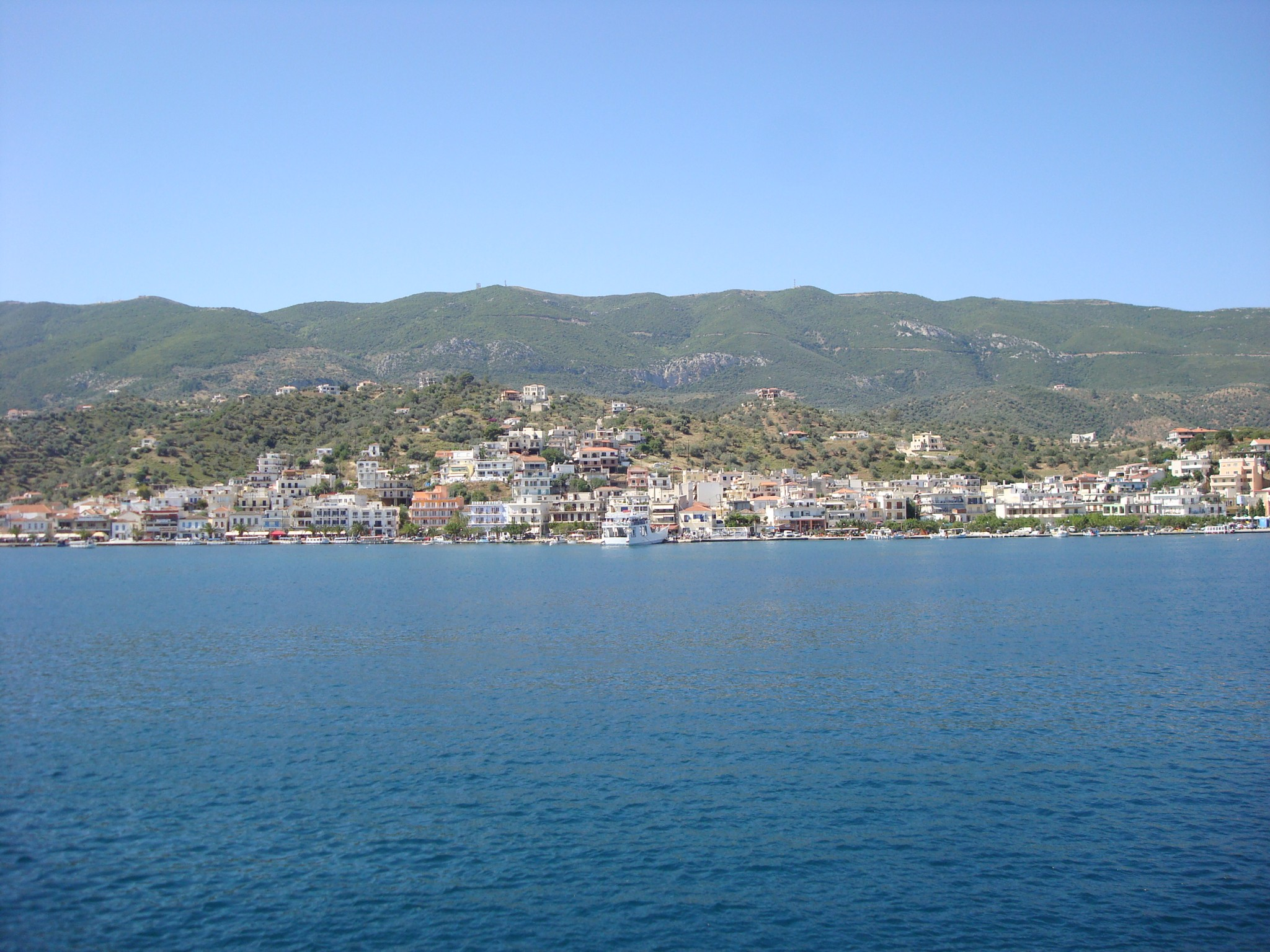
- View of Galatas from Poros

- Location within Greece
- Coordinates: 37°29′N 23°26′E
- Country: Greece
- Administrative region: Attica
- Regional unit: Islands
- Municipality: Troizinia-Methana
- Municipal unit: Troizina

Population (2021)
  - Community: 2,244
- Time zone: UTC+2 (EET)
  - Summer (DST): UTC+3 (EEST)

Galatas (Greek: Γαλατάς), is a town located in the eastern part of the Peloponnese peninsula, Greece. It is the seat of the municipality of Troizinia-Methana, which belongs to the Islands regional unit. It is situated on the coast, opposite the island of Poros, across a 400 m (1,312 ft) wide strait. The community of Galatas consists of the main town, Galatas, and the villages Agia Sotira, Vlachaiika, and Saronida.

== Description ==
The main town of Galatas is a large but quiet coastal village with a small fishing fleet, located on the mainland of Peloponnese, between Epidavros and Porto Heli, opposite Poros Island. Lemonodasos [a forest of lemon trees] is located about 3km outside the village, at Artimos en-route to Porto Heli. It is a local and nationally-known tourist attraction, popular for school excursions, but was made famous by Sir Patrick Leigh Fermor, OBE, and later by other well-known visitors such as Elizabeth Taylor and George H. W. Bush. The main attraction at Lemonodasos was Kardasi, a flour-grinding watermill which utilized the power of a waterfall and operated for many years, until the demise of its owners. Recent interest by a family in renovating the abandoned buildings now appears to be genuine and much anticipated.

The local people of Galatas make use of a regional Town Hall located within the village, which offers many services including a Citizen's Advice Bureau. Whilst parents are occupied locally with agriculture, the children at Galatas receive primary, secondary, and technical college education. Religious education, prayers, and services take place in the local church of Agios Nikolaos. Other essential facilities include:

a medical centre, two large national-chain supermarkets, independent local grocers, butchers, green-grocers, bakers, fresh fish from local fishermen, a weekly open-air vegetable market, chemists, hairdressers, florists, hardware and DIY shops, all essential professional Architectural, Civil Engineering and construction services, as well as tradesmen, several hotels, tavernas and restaurants, bars and cafes, computer-repair services, a petrol station, car and motorcycle sales and repairs, yacht dry-dock and marine craft repairs near Plaka beach, water-ski and other sport facilities, a football pitch, children's playgrounds, a camping site, etc.

Transport to Athens by modern coaches [3 hours], hydrofoils and catamarans [1+ hour], and ships [3 hours] is prompt and regular, as is the service to Poros Island by ferry-boat [5 minutes] and water-taxi [3 minutes]. The weather is moderate with warm summers and mild winters with modest rainfall. Earthquakes are rarely felt in this region.

== Historical population ==
Year	Settlement	Community
1981	2,120	
1991	2,181	
2001	2,592	2,707
2011	2,195	2,522
2021	2,145	2,244

== Persons ==
- Antonios Kriezis (in Troizina 1796–1865), a soldier who fought for the Greek War of Independence and a Prime minister of Greece between December 24, 1849 – May 28, 1854

== See also ==
- List of settlements in Attica
