= Methana Volcano =

Volcano in Greece

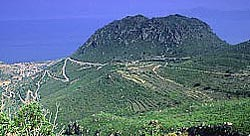
- Methana Lava dome

Highest point
- Elevation: 740 m (2,430 ft)
- Coordinates: 37°36′13″N 23°21′58″E

Geography
- Location within Greece
- Location: Methana, Greece

Geology
- Formed by: Subduction zone volcanism
- Rock age: 87,000 years
- Mountain type: Lava dome
- Volcanic arc: South Aegean Volcanic Arc
- Last eruption: 258 BCE ± 18 years

Climbing
- Easiest route: Hiking

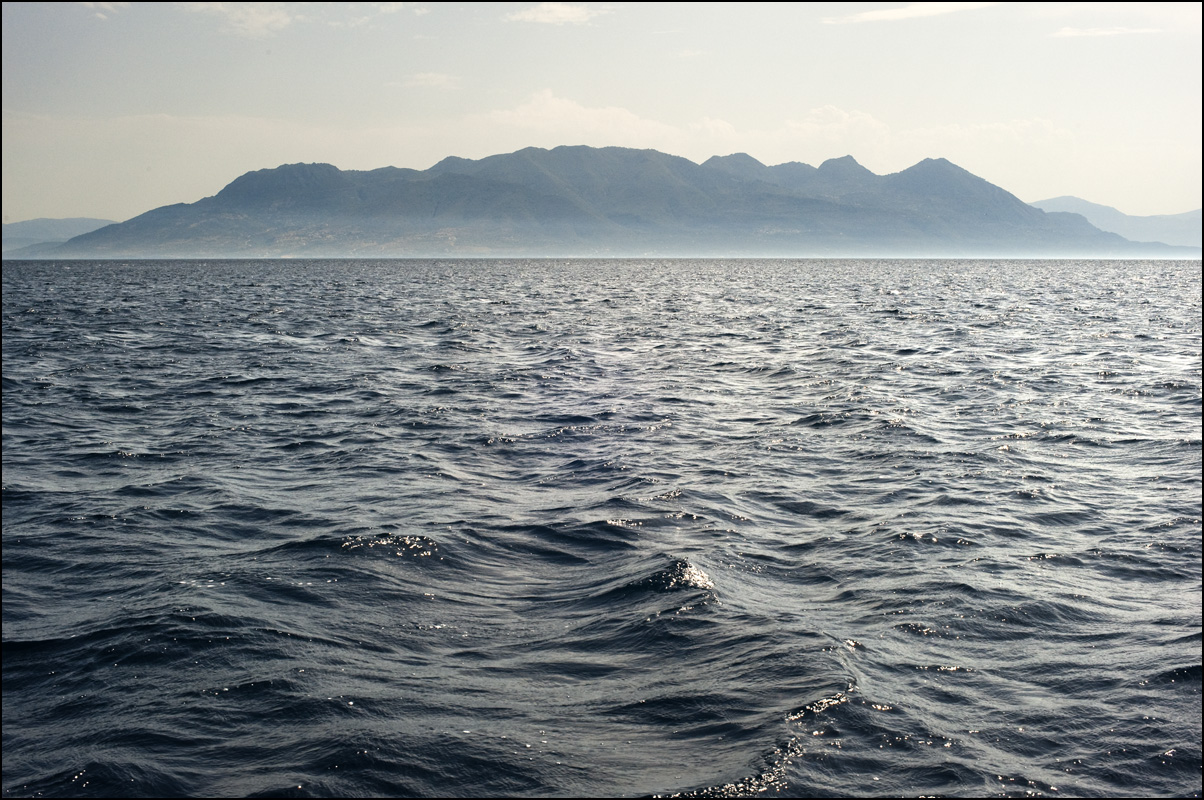
Panoramic view of Methana peninsula.

The Methana volcano peninsula is situated approximately 50 kilometres (31 mi) southwest of Athens in Greece.

== Geological history ==
The Methana (Μέθανα) peninsula contains some 32 volcanoes, including the Methana volcano, that are mostly andesitic and dacitic lava domes. The volcanic activity in the peninsula began 1 million years ago and continued sporadically until 300 years ago. The last eruptions took place in 1700 at a submarine volcano north of Kameni Chora. On land there is also the historic lava dome of Kameni Chora that erupted in 230 BC. In August 1922 there were numerous reports of a possible eruption in the Kaimeno Vouno crater, however, this still remains unconfirmed. Methana is in the northwestern part of the group of Cycladic volcanoes that are considered active (Milos, Santorini and Nisyros). The rocks are mostly dacites and andesites. On Methana there are thermal springs and mofettes (gas exhalations). Methana is cut by many tectonic faults, and so it is an area in high danger of earthquakes. The major fault cuts the town of Methana from west to east.

== Archaeological history ==
The Methana peninsula has been inhabited since about 10,000 BC. The first settlements were founded about 6,000 BC. Excavations have brought to light a village and sanctuary from Mycenaean times near the town of Methana at the chapel of Sts. Constantine & Helen. Items dating from about 1500–1200 BC are preserved in the museums of Poros island and in Piraeus Archaeological museum in Athens. There were ancient sanctuaries in Geometric times, about 800–700 BC, such as the Geometric temple near Kounoupitsa village. There are also two ancient acropoleis (Paliocastro acropolis and Oga acropolis) and many ancient farm sites. The ancient writers Ovid, Strabo and Pausanias described the historic eruption of the volcano dome near the village of Kameni Chora in the northwestern part of the Methana peninsula. Pausanias also described hot springs after the eruption. Later there were many new buildings and sanctuaries founded near the village Vathy, at the Paliocastro hill and around it. Methana was also the site of a Phoenician base called Arsinoe.
