= Mylopotamos, Cythera =

Mylopotamos Μυλοπόταμος
- Community
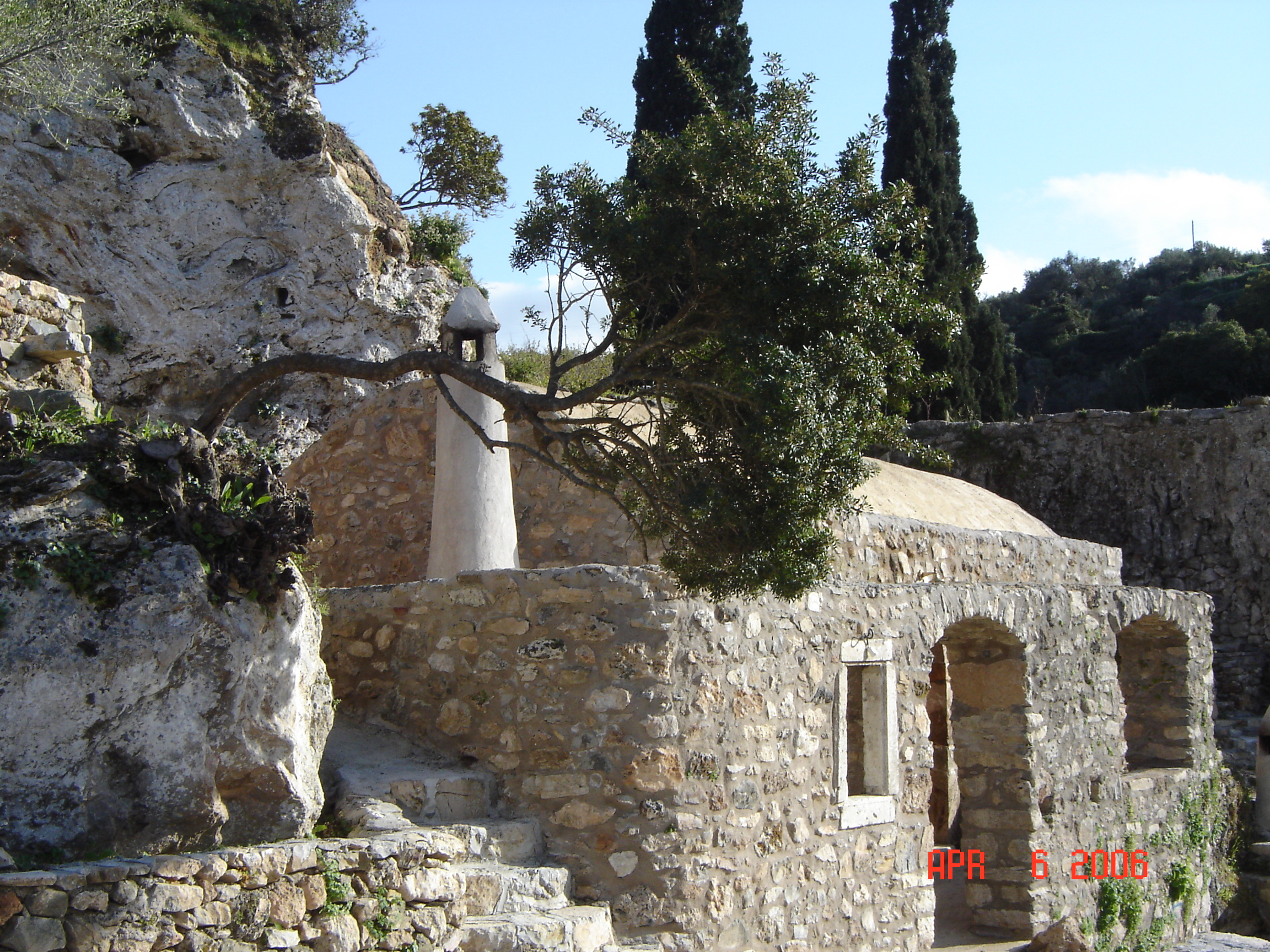
- Watermill

- Location within Greece
- Coordinates: 36°14′N 22°57′E
- Country: Greece
- Administrative region: Attica
- Regional unit: Islands
- Municipality: Kythira
- Municipal unit: Kythira
- Elevation: 284 m (932 ft)

Population (2021)
  - Community: 86
- Time zone: UTC+2 (EET)
  - Summer (DST): UTC+3 (EEST)

Mylopotamos (Greek: Μυλοπόταμος, meaning "river of mills") is a village on the island of Cythera, Southern Greece. Its average elevation is 284 m. Population 86 (2021). It was named Mylopotamos because there are 22 watermills built along a small stream. The water mills were built for grinding wheat. Today 21 of the mills are in ruins and one, the Phil's (Φιλιππή'ς) water mill, is in working condition. Phil's watermill belongs to the grandson of the last owner, Filippas (Φίλιππας), and it has been in the family for 350 years.

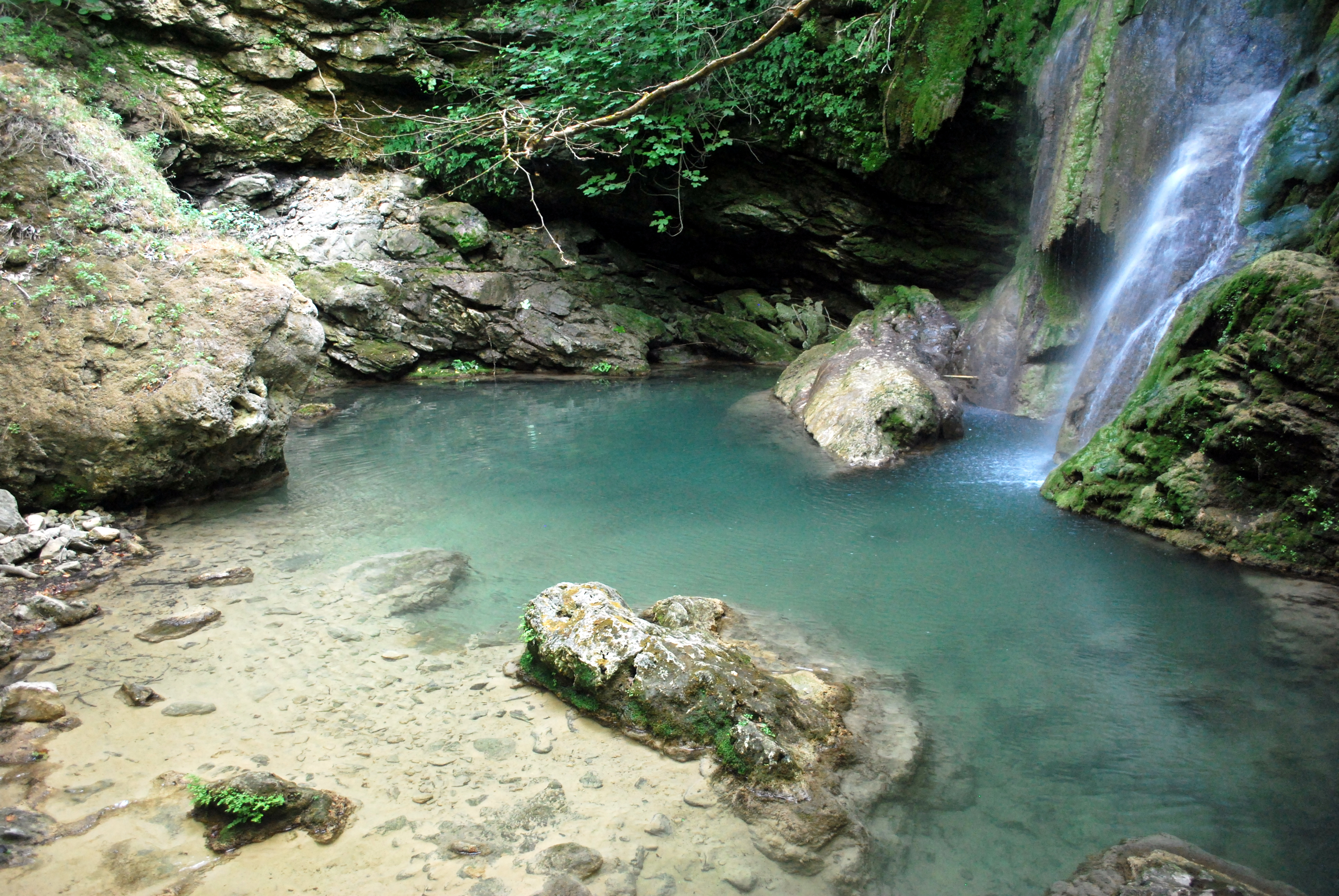
Fonissa Waterfall

In the town there are three Caves, a Venetian Castle and the Monastery of Orphan Mary. The gorge where the 22 mills are found starts from a magnificent waterfall named "Fonissa", (Φόνισσα, female killer), the only one on the island. The stream above the waterfall springs from the mountain in the middle of town, by the square, during the summer coming right out from the mountain. Upstream from town to the distant mountains there is no water during the summer. During the rainy season water flows from the distant mountains to town, filling up the up-stream portion of the stream. The stream from town flows about 200 meters to the waterfall. The mills start from the base of the water fall and go down stream to the sea. On a cliff by the gorge, is the church, Saint Catherine, which was built into the mountain. At the end of the gorge, before the water reaches the sea, is the Monastery of Orphan Mary with its cave, the second biggest cave on the island. The gorge concludes with one of the many beautiful beaches on the island called "Kalami" (Καλάμι, reed).
