= Fratsia =

Village in Greece

Fratsia Φράτσια
- Community
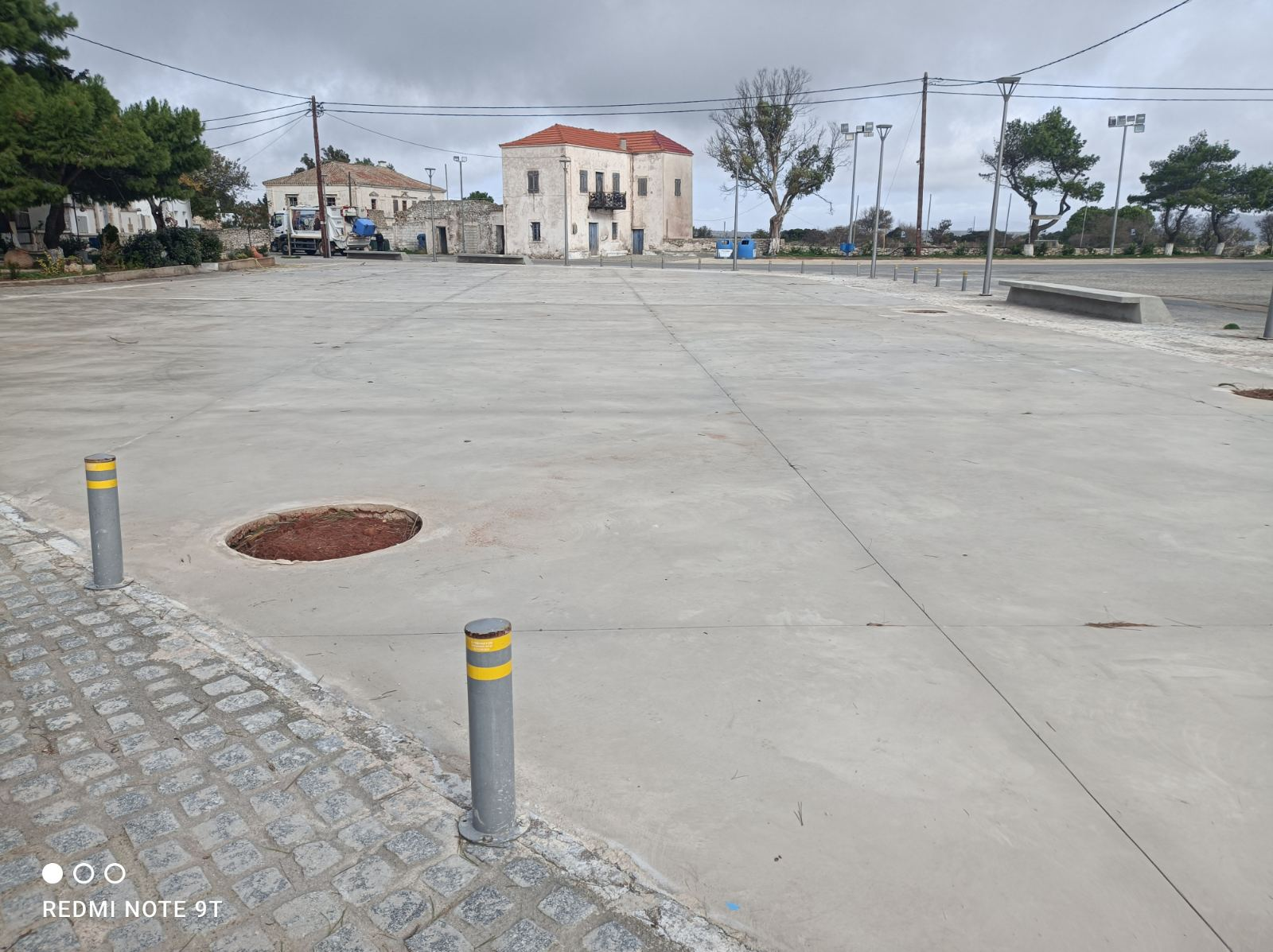

- Location within Greece
- Coordinates: 36°13′N 22°59′E
- Country: Greece
- Administrative region: Attica
- Regional unit: Islands
- Municipality: Kythira
- Municipal unit: Kythira
- Elevation: 355 m (1,165 ft)

Population (2021)
  - Community: 125
- Time zone: UTC+2 (EET)
  - Summer (DST): UTC+3 (EEST)

Fratsia is a village located roughly in the middle of the island of Kythira, Greece. Population 125 (2021). Its average elevation is 355 m.
