= Fânațe =

Fânaţe may refer to several villages in Romania:

- Fânaţe, a village in Câmpani Commune, Bihor County
- Fânaţe, a village in Urmeniș Commune, Bistriţa-Năsăud County
- Fânaţe, a village in Ceanu Mare Commune, Cluj County
- Fânaţe, a village in Cernești Commune, Maramureș County
- Fânaţe, a village in Band, Mureş
- Fânaţe, a village in Fărăgău Commune, Mureș County
- Fânaţe, a village in Iclănzel Commune, Mureș County
- Fânaţe, a village in Tăureni Commune, Mureș County

== See also ==
- Fânari (disambiguation)
