= Antheia (Argolis) =

Coordinates: 37°30′11″N 23°20′54″E

Antheia or Anthea (Ancient Greek: Ἄνθεια) was a town in the Troezene in ancient Argolis, said to have been founded by the mythological figure Anthes. In mythology, King Pittheus transferred the town's population (synoecism) to Troezen.

The site is near modern Damala.
