= Acropolis Palaiokastro =

Coordinates: 37.5867°N 23.3494°E

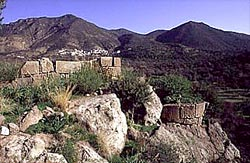
The Acropolis Palaiokastro in Methana

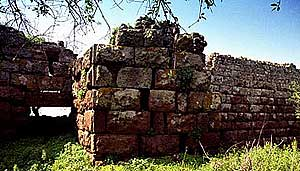

The Acropolis of ancient Methana (also known as Acropolis Paliokastro, Greek: Ακρόπολη Παλιόκαστρο) is located 1 km from the town of Megalochori in the volcanic peninsula of Methana.

== History ==
It was first built in the Mycenaean times. It was rebuilt and destroyed later during the Roman and the Byzantine times.

== Construction ==
It was built from andesite and dacite rocks from the volcanic mountain nearby. The small acropolis is located on a small lava dome.

== Significance ==
Around the acropolis, Pausanias described the ancient market (Agorá) and a sanctuary of Isis and Hermes. Remains of the ancient town Methana can be found around the Paliocastro and some Roman columns in front of the Agios Nikolaos chapel located nearby.
