= Decree of Themistocles =

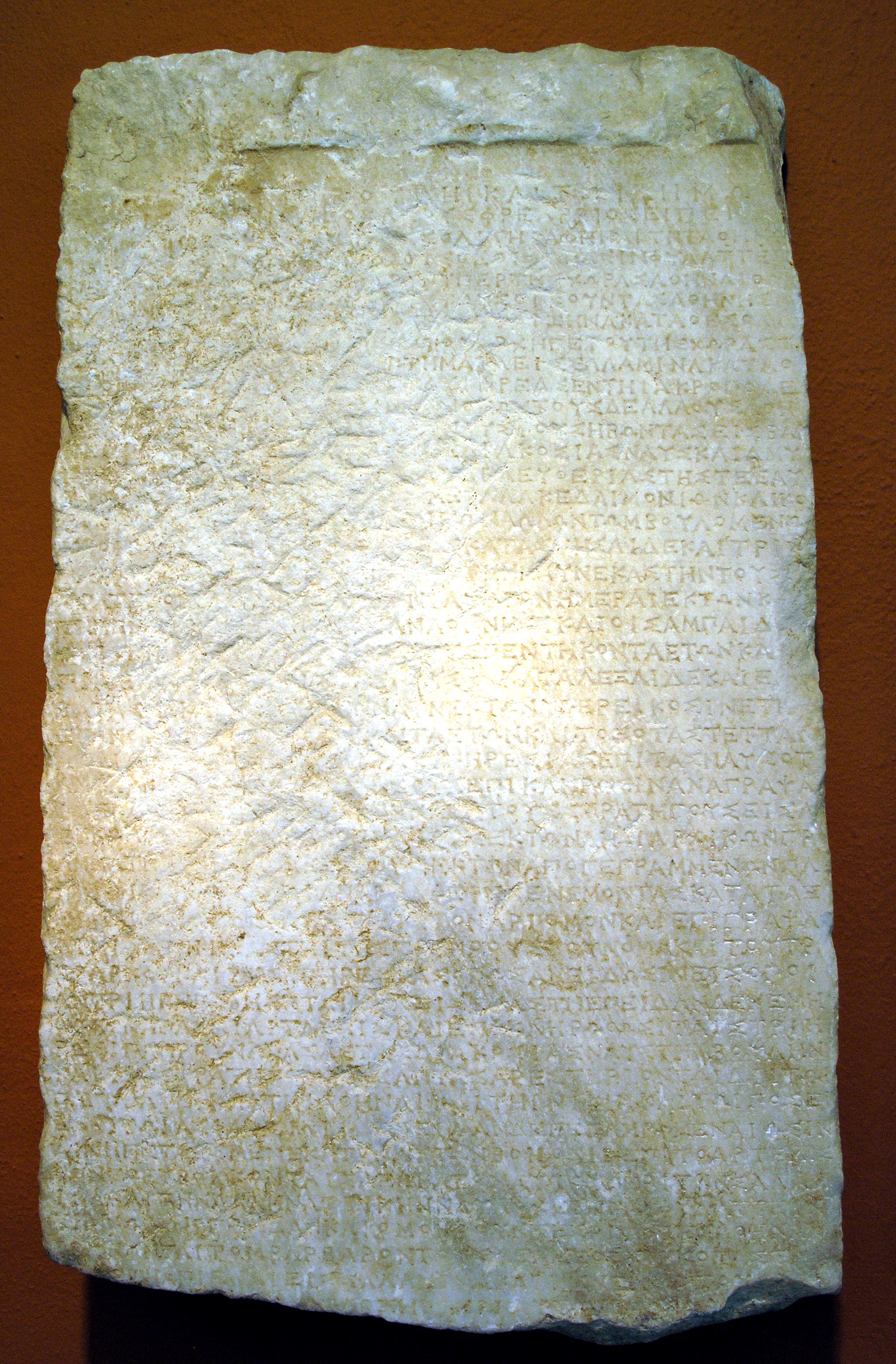
Decree of Themistocles, National Archaeological Museum of Athens, 13330

The Decree of Themistocles or Troezen Inscription is an ancient Greek inscription, found at Troezen, discussing Greek strategy in the Greco-Persian Wars, purported to have been issued by the Athenian assembly under the guidance of Themistocles. Since the publication of its contents in 1960, the authenticity of the decree has been the subject of much academic debate. The decree contradicted modern scholarly interpretations of Herodotus's account of the evacuation of Attica in 480 BC (on which see below), in which it is stated that the evacuation was an emergency measure taken only after the Peloponnesian army failed to advance into Boeotia to fight the Persians. If the decree is authentic, the abandonment of Attica was part of a considered strategy aiming to draw the Persians into naval combat at Artemisium or Salamis.

== Discovery ==
The stone bearing the Themistocles decree (Epigraphical Museum, Athens, EM 13330) was discovered at some point before 1959 by Anargyros Titiris, a local farmer at Troezen, in the northeastern Peloponnese. For some time, he used the inscribed marble slab as a doorstep. In 1959, he donated the stone to a collection of artifacts from Troezen that a local schoolteacher was displaying at a coffeehouse. There, Professor M.H. Jameson of the University of Pennsylvania saw the slab, and, the next year, published its contents along with a translation and commentary.

== Contents ==
The inscription begins with a statement that the contents are a resolution of the Athenian assembly, proposed by Themistocles. It then lays out a plan to evacuate the women, children, and elderly of Athens. The majority of the extant text then turns to the specifics of preparing the fleet, with the text on the slab becoming illegible before the end of the decree.

The inscription is cut in the stoichedon style, with 42 letters to a line, except for an accidental additional stoichos at the ends of lines 38-41. The following translation is from Michael H. Jameson with edits by Benjamin Dean Meritt and A.R. Burn. It maintains, as far as possible, the lines of the Greek, which usually divide in the middle of a word:

G O D S

It was Resolved by the Council and People:
Themistokles, son of Neokles of Phrearroi, proposed:
To deliver the City in trust to Athena the Mistress
of Athens and all the other gods to guard
and ward off the barbarian from the land; and that the Atheni-
ans themselves and the foreigners who dwell in Athens
shall deposit their children and wives in Troizen
. . . . . . . . . . the patron of the land,
and old people and goods in Salamis.
That the treasurers and priestesses on the Acropolis
remain guarding the things of the gods; and the other Athe-
nians all, and the foreigners of military age, em-
bark on the 200 ships which have been made ready and de-
fend against the barbarian their freedom and that
of the other Hellenes, with the Lakedaimonians and Co-
rinthians and Aiginetans and the others who choose
to share the danger. That there be appointed trie-
rarchs two hundred, one for each ship, by the Ge-
nerals, beginning tomorrow, from among those who
have land and house in Athens and sons
born in wedlock and are not over fifty years old, and
that they assign the ships to them by lot. That they enrol
marines ten to each ship from among those over twenty years
of age and under thirty, and four archers;
and that they allot the petty officers to the ships
at the same time when they allot the trierarchs. That the
generals also write up lists of the crews of the ships on
notice-boards, the Athenians from the service re-
gisters and foreigners from those registered with
Polemarch. That they write them up dividing them into
200 companies, by hundreds, writing over
each company the name of the ship and of the tri-
erarch and those of the petty officers, so that men may know
in which ship each company is to embark. And when
all the companies are made up and allotted to the tri-
remes, the Council shall complete the manning of all the 200 ships
with the Generals, after sacrificing a propitiatory offering to Zeus
Almighty and Athena and Victory and Poseidon
the Preserver. And when the ships are fully manned,
with one hundred of them to meet the enemy at the Artemis-
ion in Euboia and with the other hundred of them off Salam-
is and the rest of Attica to lie and guard
the land. And that all Athenians may be of one mind
in the defence against the barbarian, those banished for the
ten years shall depart to Salamis and remain there
until the People come to a decision about them; and the . . .

Six letters at the end of line 47 and an unknown number of lines below are lost.

== Significance ==
If the account of the evacuation of Athens implied by the Themistocles decree is accurate, the Herodotean account of the events of 480 BC must be revised to reflect a Greek strategy, agreed on in June, focused on stopping the Persian advance at Salamis and the Isthmus of Corinth. If this was indeed the Greek plan, then Thermopylae and Artemisium, which Herodotus describes as all-out attempts to defeat the Persian invasion, would in fact have been only holding actions intended to give time for the evacuation of Attica and the preparation of the defenses of the isthmus.

== Academic controversy ==
Challenging as it did the prevailing interpretation of the Herodotean account that had up to that point stood as the definitive account of the Greco-Persian Wars, the authenticity of the Themistocles decree soon became the subject of heated scholarly debate. A study of the letter forms used suggested that the marble slab on which the decree was inscribed had been carved in the first half of the 3rd century BC, raising the question of how the text had survived for two centuries, particularly given that Athens was sacked by the Persians in 480 and again in 479 BC in the Achaemenid destruction of Athens. The first extant mention of a decree that can be identified with the one found at Troezen comes from Demosthenes, who records that Aeschines read the decree aloud in 347 BC, again leaving a gap of over a century to account for. Scholars who support the authenticity of the decree point to the last two lines of the famous oracle given to the Athenians:

Divine Salamis, you will bring death to women's sons
When the corn is scattered, or the harvest gathered in.

The identification of Salamis as the site of slaughter would seem to suggest that a strategy calling for a battle there had already been agreed upon by the Greek commanders, which would indicate that the account supported by the Themistocles decree is correct. Scholars skeptical of the decree however raise a number of arguments against its authenticity. The correlation provided by the oracle's mention of Salamis has been challenged by pointing out that oracles were sometimes altered after the fact; various anachronisms in phrasing have been pointed out, although supporters of the text's authenticity dismiss these, noting that Greek practice was to paraphrase documents rather than copy them verbatim; finally, more serious content issues, ranging from chronologically suspect passages to statements that seem out of place in an official decree to serious conflicts with Herodotus's detailed descriptions of Greek troop dispositions. In light of these objections, John Fine has argued that it is best to treat the Themistocles decree, if authentic, as an amalgamation of several decrees released at different times.

Nothing in the decree explicitly contradicts the narrative of Herodotus, only modern scholarly interpretations of Herodotus, which tended to see Thermopylae and Artemision as "all-out" efforts to stop the Persian advance. The historian himself nowhere explicitly ascribes definitive dates or strategic intention to the Greeks or the Athenians. In fact, the narrative of Herodotus at 8.40, often pointed to as a crux of inconsistency between Herodotus and the decree, tends to support the authenticity of the decree. "The Athenians requested them to put in at Salamis so that they take their children and women out of Attica and also take counsel what they should do. They had been disappointed in their plans, so they were going to hold a council about the current state of affairs. [2] They expected to find the entire population of the Peloponnese in Boeotia awaiting the barbarian, but they found no such thing. " The Athenians, cheated of their hopes of a longer holding action at Thermopylae and Artemision and finding no resistance to the Persian advance being prepared in Boeotia, ask the other Greeks to stop at Salamis so that their families, presumably prepared to evacuate by the terms of the decree, can be conveyed to Salamis and Troezen. The decree itself is mute as to preparation of fortifications at the Isthmus and so, again, there is no explicit contradiction with the narrative of Herodotus.

== Sources ==
- Fine, John V.A. The Ancient Greeks: A critical history (Harvard University Press, 1983) ISBN 0-674-03314-0
- Herodotus, Histories
