= Donauwörth =

- Town
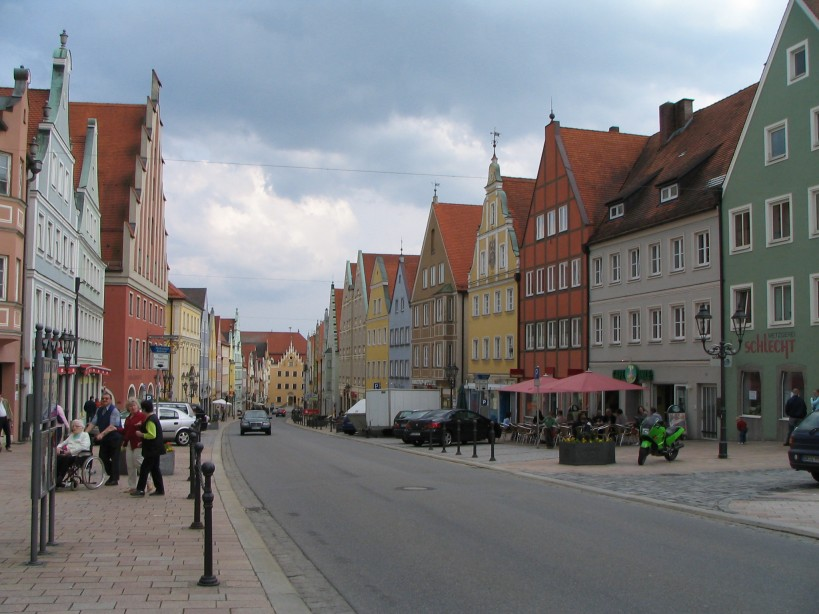
- Reichsstrasse, Donauwörth

- Coat of arms

- Location of Donauwörth within Donau-Ries district
- Interactive map of Donauwörth
- Location within Germany Location within Bavaria
- Coordinates: 48°42′N 10°48′E
- Country: Germany
- State: Bavaria
- Admin. region: Swabia
- District: Donau-Ries

Government
  - Mayor (2020–26): Jürgen Sorrè (Ind.)

Area
  - Total: 77.04 km^{2} (29.75 sq mi)
- Elevation: 410 m (1,350 ft)

Population (2025-12-31)
  - Total: 20,024
  - Density: 259.9/km^{2} (673.2/sq mi)
- Time zone: UTC+01:00 (CET)
  - Summer (DST): UTC+02:00 (CEST)
- Postal codes: 86609
- Dialling codes: 0906
- Vehicle registration: DON
- Website: www.donauwoerth.de

Donauwörth (German: [ˌdoːnaʊˈvøːɐ̯t]; Swabian: Donawerd) is a town and the capital of the Donau-Ries district in Swabia, Bavaria, Germany. It is said to have been founded by two fishermen where the rivers Danube (Donau) and Wörnitz meet. The city is part of the scenic route called "Romantische Straße" (Romantic Road).

The city is situated between Munich and Nuremberg, 46 km (29 mi) north of Augsburg.

== History ==
Donauwörth grew up in the course of the 11th and 12th centuries under the protection of the castle of Mangoldstein, became in the 13th century a seat of Duke Ludwig II of Bavaria, who, however, soon withdrew to Munich to escape from his wife, Duchess Maria of Brabant, whom he had there beheaded on an unfounded suspicion of infidelity. The town received the freedom of the Holy Roman Empire in 1308, and maintained its position in spite of the encroachments of Bavaria till 1607, when the interference of the Protestant inhabitants with the abbot of the Heilig-Kreuz called forth an imperial law authorizing the duke of Bavaria to punish them for the offence.

It is historically important to Germany as the site of one of the incidents which led to the Thirty Years' War (1618–1648). In 1606, the Lutheran majority barred the Catholic Church residents of the town from holding an annual Markus procession, causing a riot to break out. During the war, it was stormed by Gustavus Adolphus (1632) and captured by Ferdinand III (1634).

Donauwörth was later the scene of the Battle of Schellenberg (or Battle of Donauwörth) on 2 July 1704, during the War of the Spanish Succession (1702–1713). The battle was named after the village and high ground behind the city. John Churchill, 1st Duke of Marlborough, was marching from Flanders to Bavaria and came to the Danube. The French decided to make a crossing of the Danube at Donauwörth, where they were surprised by Marlborough's troops and after heavy fighting pulled back. That allowed Marlborough to capture Donauwörth and cross the Danube without any problem. Another battle of Donauwörth on 7 October 1805 opened Napoleon's Ulm campaign.

== Notable citizens ==
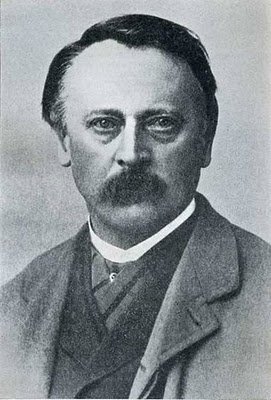
Franz Hartmann

- 1291–1351 Margareta Ebner, German mystic
- 1499–1543 Sebastian Franck, was a 16th-century German freethinker, humanist, and radical reformer
- 1838–1912 Franz Hartmann, theosophist, occultist, geomancer, astrologer and author.
- 1848–1934 Michael Deffner, philologist and archaeologist
- 1861–1933 Ferdinand Bonn, stage and film actor
- 1901–1983 Werner Egk, composer
- 1942 Werner Schnitzer, actor
- 1948 Manfred G. Schmidt, professor of political science
- 1980 Carolin Hingst, pole vaulter
- 1980 Sercan Güvenışık, footballer

== Twin towns – sister cities ==
Donauwörth is twinned with:

- Perchtoldsdorf, Austria

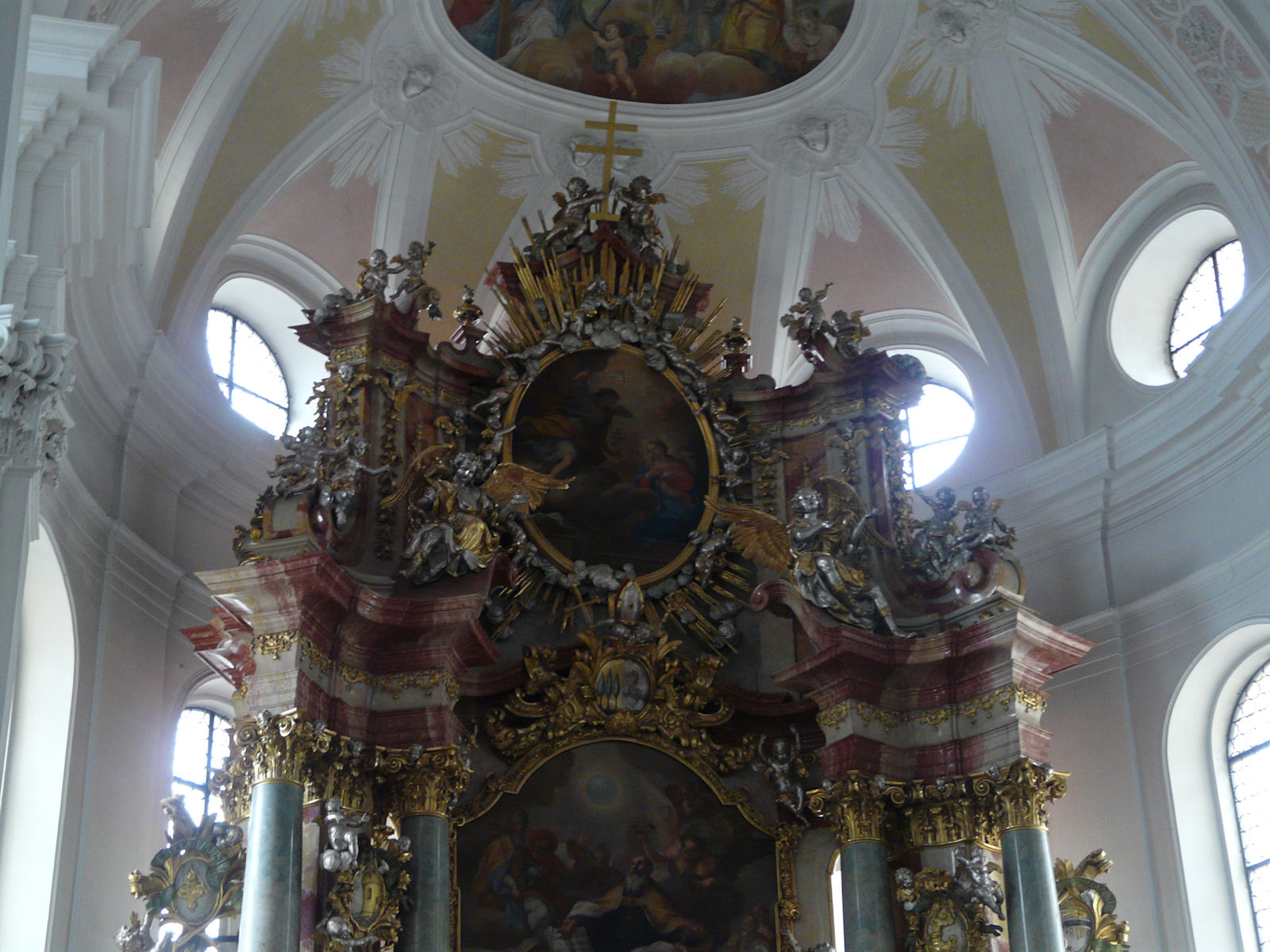
Kloster Heilig Kreuz church, Decorations above the main altar.

== See also ==
- Danube
