= Fanari =

Fanari may refer to the following places:

- in Greece:
  - Ano Fanari, a place in Troizinia-Methana
  - Fanari, Elis, part of the municipality of Andritsaina-Krestena in Elis
  - Fanari, Karditsa, part of the municipality of Mouzaki in the Karditsa regional unit
  - Fanari, Preveza, a municipal unit in the Preveza regional unit, part of Parga
  - Fanari, Rhodope, part of the municipality of Aigeiros in the Rhodope regional unit
- Fânari (disambiguation), several places in Romania
