= Fânari =

Fânari may refer to several villages in Romania:

- Fânari, a village in Gorgota Commune, Prahova County
- Fânari, a village in Olari Commune, Prahova County

== See also ==
- Fanari (disambiguation)
- Fânațe (disambiguation)
