= Acropolis =

Defensive settlement of an ancient Greek city built on high ground

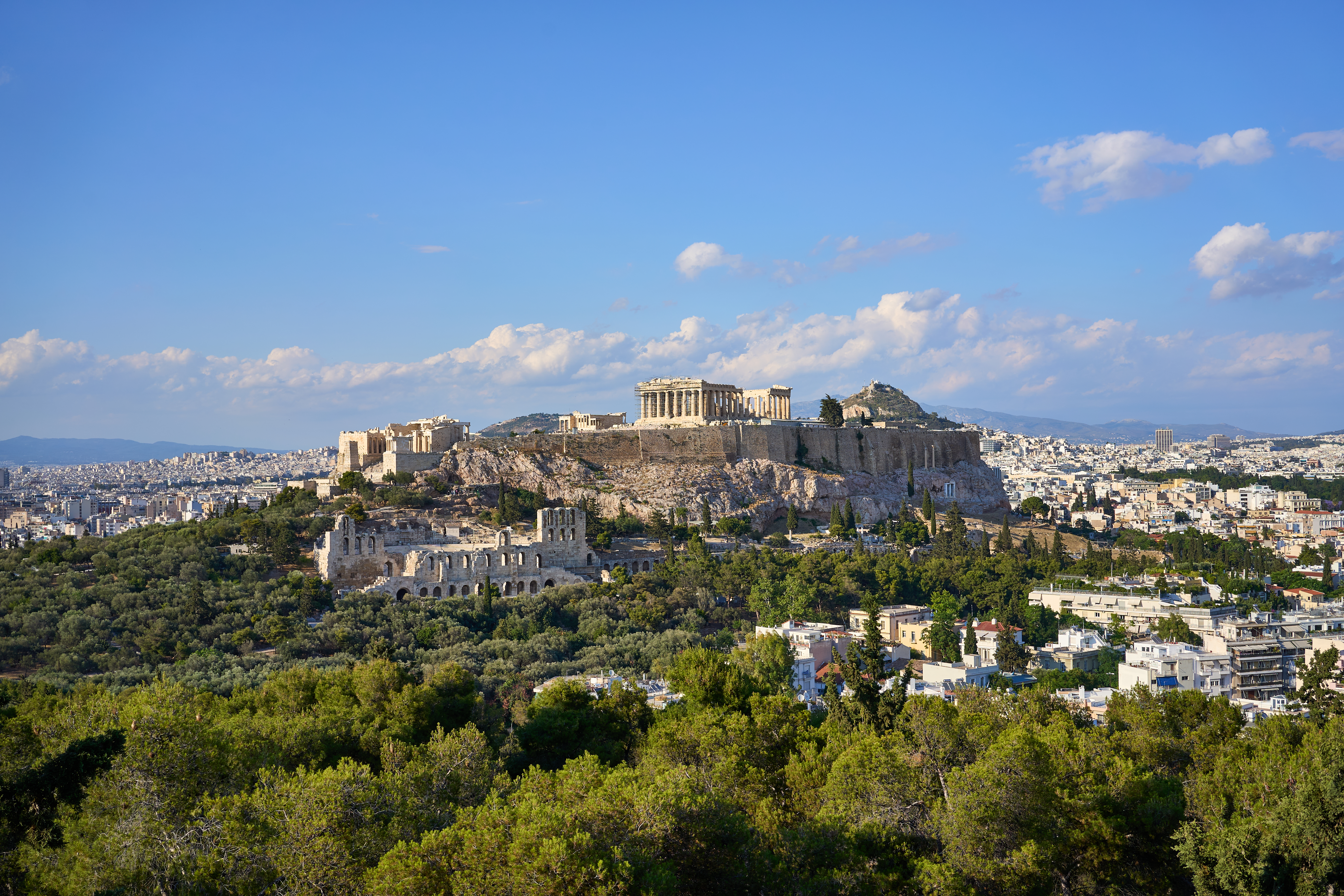
Acropolis of Athens in Athens, Greece

An acropolis was the settlement of an upper part of an ancient Greek city, especially a citadel, and frequently a hill with precipitous sides, mainly chosen for purposes of defense. The term is typically used to refer to the Acropolis of Athens, yet nearly every Greek city had an acropolis of its own. The term derives from the homonymous Greek word "Ακρόπολις", composed from "akron" (ἄκρον), which means "top", and "polis" (πόλις), which means "city".

Acropolises were used as religious centers and places of worship, forts, and places in which the royal and high-status resided. Acropolises became the nuclei of large cities of classical ancient times, and served as important centers of a community. Some well-known acropolises have become the centers of tourism in the present day, and they are a rich source of archaeological information of ancient Greece, especially, the Acropolis of Athens.

== Origin ==
The plural of acropolis (ακρόπολη) is acropolises, also commonly as acropoleis and acropoles, and ακροπόλεις in Greek. The term acropolis is also used to describe the central complex of overlapping structures, such as plazas and pyramids, in many Mayan cities, including Tikal and Copán. Acropolis is also the term used by archaeologists and historians for the urban Castro culture settlements located in Northwestern Iberian hilltops.

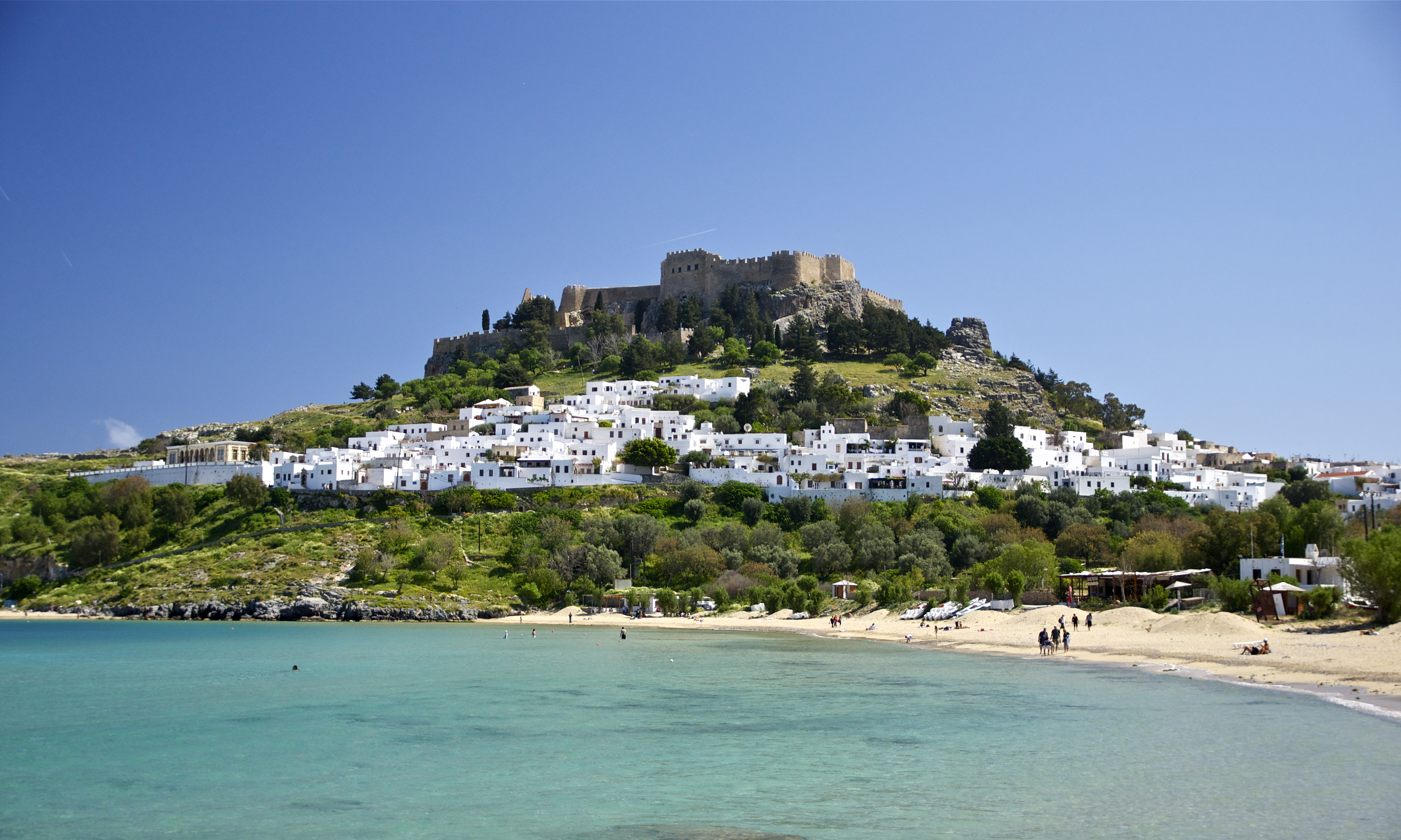
Acropolis of Lindos, on the island of Rhodes, Greece

It is primarily associated with the Greek cities of Athens, Argos (with Larisa), Thebes (with Cadmea), Corinth (with its Acrocorinth), and Rhodes (with its Acropolis of Lindos). It may also be applied generically to all such citadels including Rome, Carthage, Jerusalem, Celtic Bratislava, Asia Minor, or Castle Rock in Edinburgh. An example in Ireland is the Rock of Cashel. In Central Italy, many small rural communes still cluster at the base of a fortified habitation known as rocca of the commune. Other parts of the world have developed other names for the high citadel, or alcázar, which often have reinforced a naturally strong site. Because of this, many cultures have included acropolises in their societies; however, they do not use the same name for them.

== Differing acropolises ==
The acropolis of a city was used in many ways, with regard to ancient time and through references. Because an acropolis was built at the highest part of a city, it served as a highly functional form of protection, a fortress, and was as well as a home to the royal of a city and a centre for religion through the worshipping of different gods. There have been many classical and ancient acropolises, including the most commonly-known, Acropolis of Athens, as well as the Tepecik Acropolis at Patara, Ankara Acropolis, Acropolis of La Blanca, Acropolis at the Maya Site in Guatemala, and the Acropolis at Halieis.

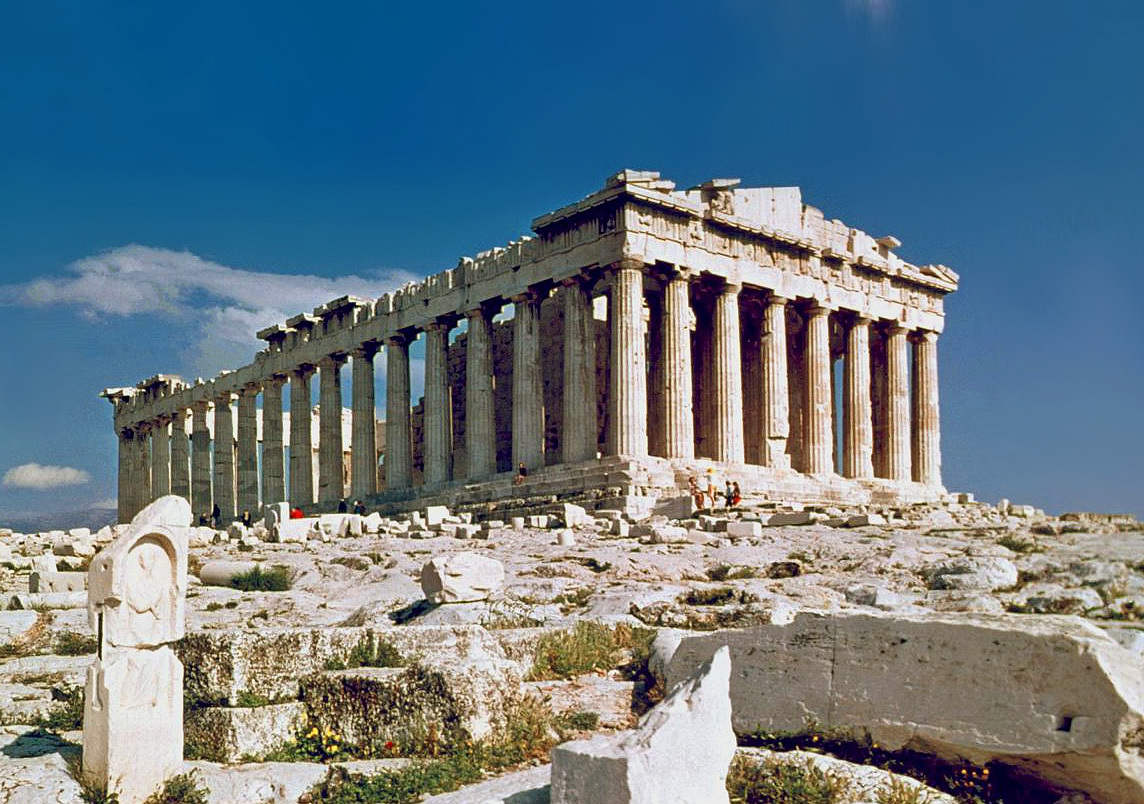
The Parthenon in Athens

The most famous example is the Athenian Acropolis, which is a collection of structures featuring a citadel on the highest part of land in ancient (and modern-day) Athens, Greece. Many notable structures at the site were constructed in the 5th century BCE, including the Propylaea, Erechtheion, and the Temple of Athena. The Temple is also commonly known as the Parthenon, which is derived the divine Athena Parthenos. There were often dances, music and plays held at the acropolis, which it served as a community centre for the city of Athens. It became a prime tourist destination by the 2nd century AD during the Roman Empire and was known as "the Greece of Greece," as coined by an unknown poet. Although originating in the mainland of Greece, use of the acropolis model quickly spread to Greek colonies such as the Dorian Lato on Crete during the Archaic Period.

The Tepecik Acropolis at Patara served as a harbor to nearby communities and naval forces, such as Antigonos I Monopthalmos and Demetrios Poliorketes, and combined land and sea. Its fortification wall and Bastion date back to the Classical period. The acropolis was constructed in the fourth century BCE by the Hekatomnids that ultimately led to its seizure in 334 BCE by Alexander the Great. The acropolis contributed significantly to the overall development that took place during the Hellenistic empires. This acropolis was the earliest place of settlement, probably dating back to the third millennium BCE. During excavations that took place in 1989, ceramic items, terracotta figurines, coins, bone and stone objects were found that date to the fourth century BCE. The fortification wall and bastion that are built at this acropolis uses a style of masonry, commonly known as the Greek word ἔμπλεκτον (meaning "woven"). This style of masonry was likely used for weight-bearing purposes.

The Acropolis at Halieis dates back to the Neolithic and Classical periods. It included a fortified wall, sanctuary of Apollo (two temples, an altar, a race course), and necropolis (cemetery). This acropolis was the highest point of fortification on the south edge at Halieis. There was a small open-air cult space, including an altar and monuments.

The Ankara Acropolis, which was set in modern-day Turkey, is a historically prominent space that has changed over time through the urban development of the country from the Phrygian period. This acropolis was well known as a spot for holy worshipping, and was symbolic of the time. It has also been a place that has historically recognized the legislative changes that Turkey has faced.

The Acropolis of La Blanca was created in Guatemala as a small ancient Maya settlement and archaeological site that is located adjacent to the Salsipuedes River. This acropolis developed as a place of residence for the city of La Blanca's rulers. Its main period of usage was during the Classical period of 600 AD to 850 AD, as the city developed as a commercial place of trade among a number of nearby settlements.

The Mayan Acropolis site in Guatemala included a burial site and vaulted tombs of the highest status royal. This funerary structure was integrated into this sacred landscape, and illustrated the prosperity of power between the royal figures of Pedras Negras in Guatemala.

== Modern-day uses ==
=== Tourism ===
Acropolises today have become the epicenters of tourism and attraction sites in many modern-day Greek cities. The Athenian Acropolis, in particular, is the most famous, and has the best vantage point in Athens, Greece. Today, tourists can purchase tickets to visit the Athenian Acropolis, including walking, sightseeing, and bus tours, as well as a classic Greek dinner.

=== Cultural ties ===
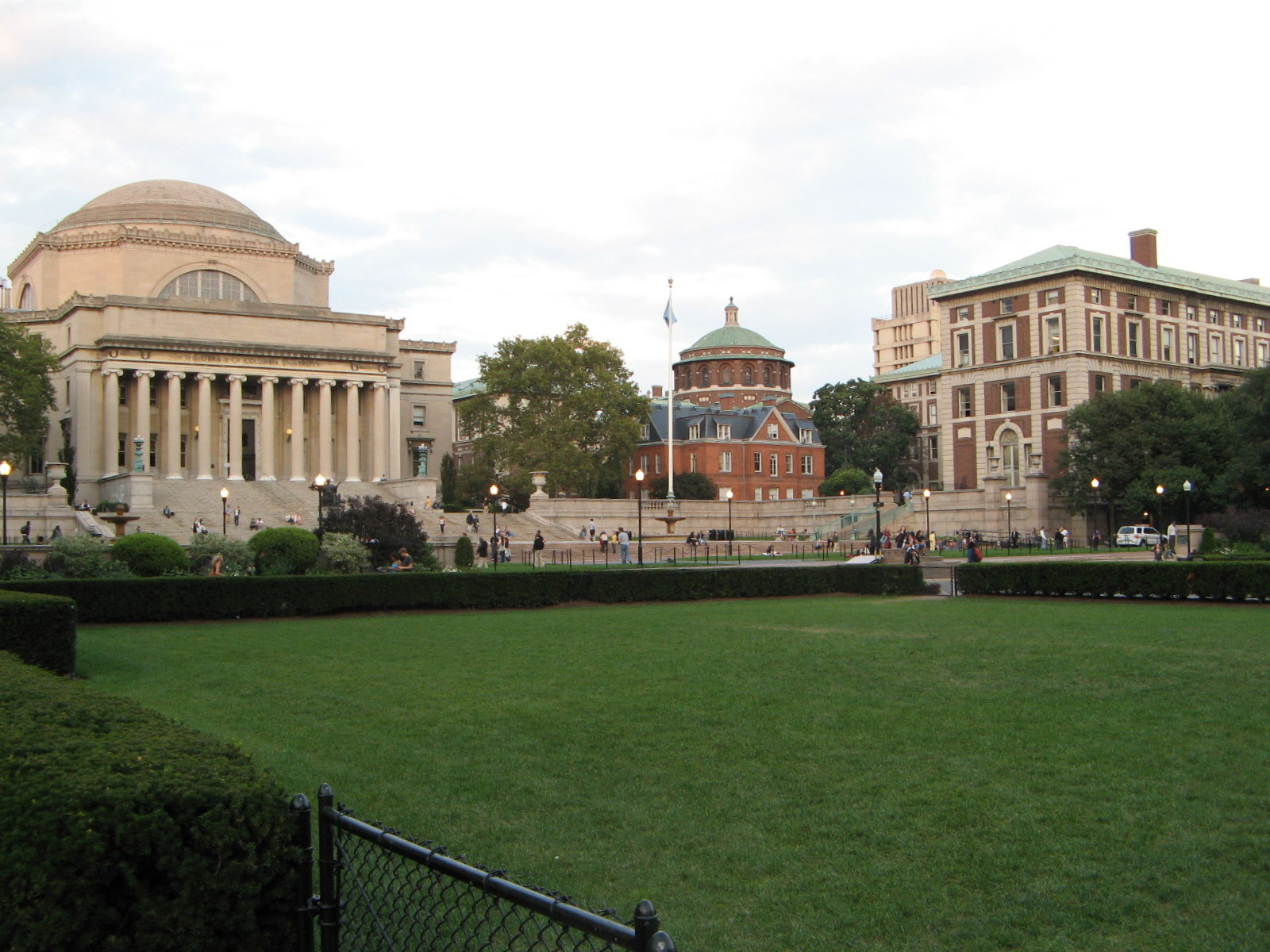
Columbia University in Morningside Heights, Manhattan

Because of its classical Hellenistic and Greco-Roman style, the ruins of Mission San Juan Capistrano's Great Stone Church in California, United States has been called an American Acropolis. The civilization developed its religious, educational, and cultural aspects of the acropolis, and is used today as a location that holds events, such as operas.

The neighborhood of Morningside Heights in New York City is commonly referred to as the "Academic Acropolis" due to its high elevation and the concentration of educational institutions in the area, including Columbia University and its affiliates, Barnard College, Teachers College, Union Theological Seminary and the Jewish Theological Seminary of America; Manhattan School of Music; Bank Street College of Education; and New York Theological Seminary. The analogy is also aided by the neoclassical architecture of the Columbia University campus, which was designed by McKim, Mead & White in the early 20th century.

=== Excavations ===
Much of the modern-day uses of acropolises have been discovered through excavations that have developed over the course of many years. For example, the Athenian Acropolis includes a Great Temple that holds the Parthenon, a specific space for ancient worship. Through today's findings and research, the Parthenon treasury is able to be recognized as the west part of the structure (the Erechtheion), as well as the Parthenon itself. Most excavations have been able to provide archaeologists with samples of pottery, ceramics, and vessels. The excavation of the Acropolis of Halieis produced remains that provided context that dated the Acropolis at Halieis from the Final Neolithic period through the first Early Helladic period.

== See also ==
- Acropolis of Rhodes
- Acropolis Palaiokastro
- Idjang
- Tell (archaeology)
- Hillfort
