= Troezen =

Town in the Peloponnese, Greece

Troezen Τροιζήνα
- Municipal unit
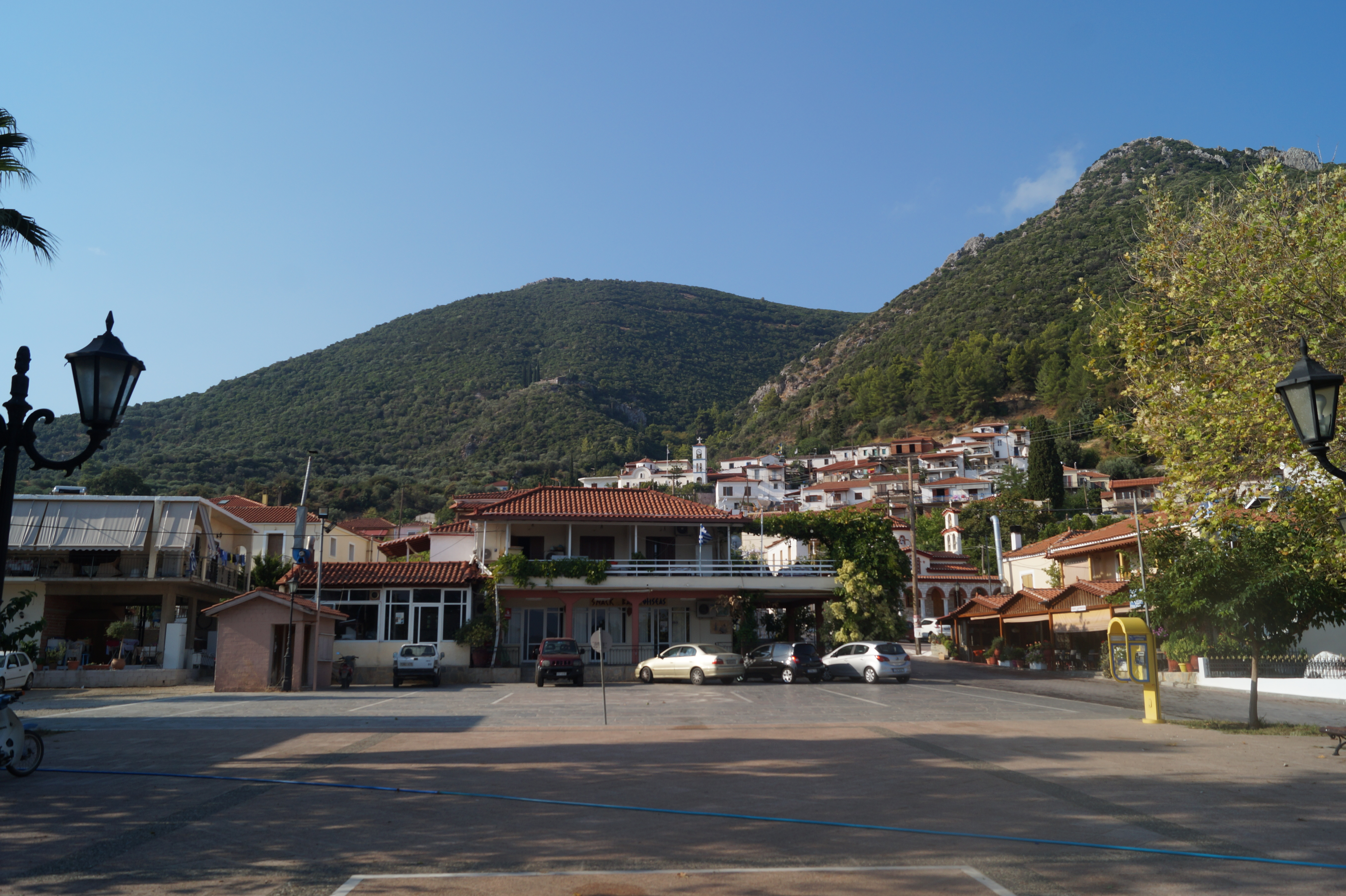
- Central square of Troezen

- Location within the regional unit

- Location within Greece
- Coordinates: 37°29′N 23°21′E
- Country: Greece
- Geographic region: Peloponnese
- Administrative region: Attica
- Regional unit: Islands
- Municipality: Troizinia-Methana

Area
  - Municipal unit: 190.697 km^{2} (73.629 sq mi)
- Elevation: 23 m (75 ft)

Population (2021)
  - Municipal unit: 4,668
  - Municipal unit density: 24.48/km^{2} (63.40/sq mi)
  - Community: 734
- Time zone: UTC+2 (EET)
  - Summer (DST): UTC+3 (EEST)
- Postal code: 180 20
- Area code: 22980
- Website: www.dimos-trizinas.gr

Troezen (/ˈtriːzən/; ancient Greek: Τροιζήν, modern Greek: Τροιζήνα [tri'zina]) is a small town and a former municipality in the northeastern Peloponnese, Greece, on the Argolid Peninsula. Since the 2011 local government reform it is part of the municipality Troizinia-Methana, of which it is a municipal unit. It is part of the Islands regional unit. In the 2021 census it had a population of 4,668.

Troezen is located southwest of Athens, across the Saronic Gulf, and a few miles south of Methana. The seat of the former municipality was in Galatas. Before 2011, Troizina was part of the Argolis and Korinthos prefecture from 1833 to 1925, Attica prefecture from 1925 to 1964, Piraeus Prefecture from 1964 to 1972 and then back in Attica prefecture (in antiquity it was part of Argolis). The municipality had a land area of 190.697 km^{2}. Its largest towns and villages were Galatás, Kalloní, Troizína, Taktikoúpoli, Karatzás, Dryópi, Ágios Geórgios, and Agía Eléni. It included numerous smaller settlements as well.

== Mythology ==
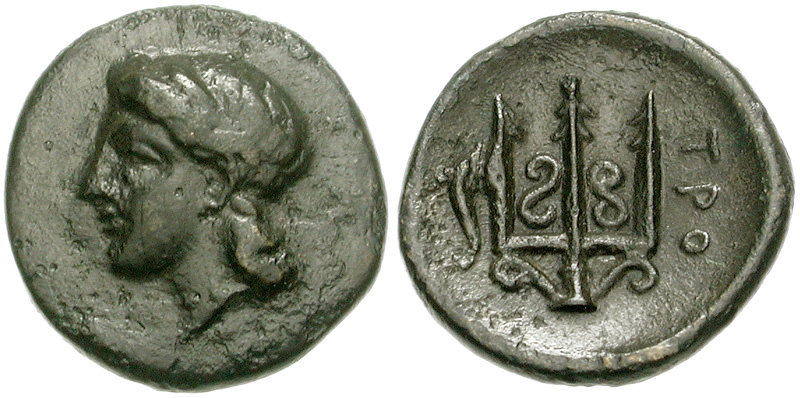
Coin (chalkous) from Troezen, 325–300 BC. Obverse: Head of Athena wearing tainia. Reverse: Ornate trident head; to left, dolphin upward; to right, ΤΡΟ(ΙΖΗΝΙΩΝ) "of Troizenians"

According to Greek mythology, Troezen came into being as a result of two ancient cities, Hyperea and Antheia, being unified by Pittheus, who named the new city in honor of his deceased brother, Troezen.

Troezen was where Aethra, daughter of Pittheus, slept with both Aegeus and Poseidon on the same night and fell pregnant with the great Greek hero Theseus. Before returning to Athens, Aegeus left his sandals and sword under a large boulder in Troezen and requested that when the child was able to prove himself by moving the boulder, he must return the items to his father in Athens; Theseus lifted the boulder when he came of age.

Troezen is the setting of Euripides' tragedy Hippolytus, which recounts the story of the eponymous son of Theseus who becomes the subject of the love of his stepmother, Phaedra. While fleeing the city, Hippolytus is killed when his chariot is attacked by a bull rising from the sea. Other plays on the same subject have been written by Seneca and Jean Racine, which are also set in Troezen.

The ancient city had a spring that was supposedly formed where the winged horse Pegasus once came to ground.

== History ==
A cult built up in the ancient city around the legend of Hippolytus. Troezen girls traditionally dedicated a lock of their hair to him before their marriage.

Sybaris in Magna Graecia was a Troezenian colony (founded 720 BC).

Before the Battle of Salamis (480 BC), Athenian women and children were sent to Troezen for safety on the instructions of the Athenian statesman Themistocles. In 1959, a stele was found in a coffee house in Troezen, depicting the Decree of Themistocles, the order to evacuate Athens. The stele has since been dated to some 200 years after the Battle of Salamis, indicating that it is probably a commemorative copy of the original order.

The temple of Isis was built by the Halicarnassians in Troezen because it was their mother-city, but the image of Isis was dedicated by the people of Troezen. The city also bore the name Apollonia (Ancient Greek: Ἀπολλωνία) in antiquity.

In the Middle Ages, it was known as Damala (Δαμαλᾶ) and was the seat of a barony of the Principality of Achaea.

The city fell under Frankish Occupation after the fourth Crusade in the 13th century, and became a part of the Duchy of Athens. At that time it was known as Damalet (Νταμαλέτ) or Elamala (Ελαμάλα).

It was conquered by the Ottoman Empire sometime prior to the 16th century and it remained under Ottoman rule until its liberation in 1821 during the Greek War of Independence. In 1827 it housed the Third National Assembly, which ratified the first definitive Constitution of Greece and elected the first governor of the country.
