= Troizinia-Methana =

Troizinia-Methana Τροιζηνία-Μέθανα
- Municipality
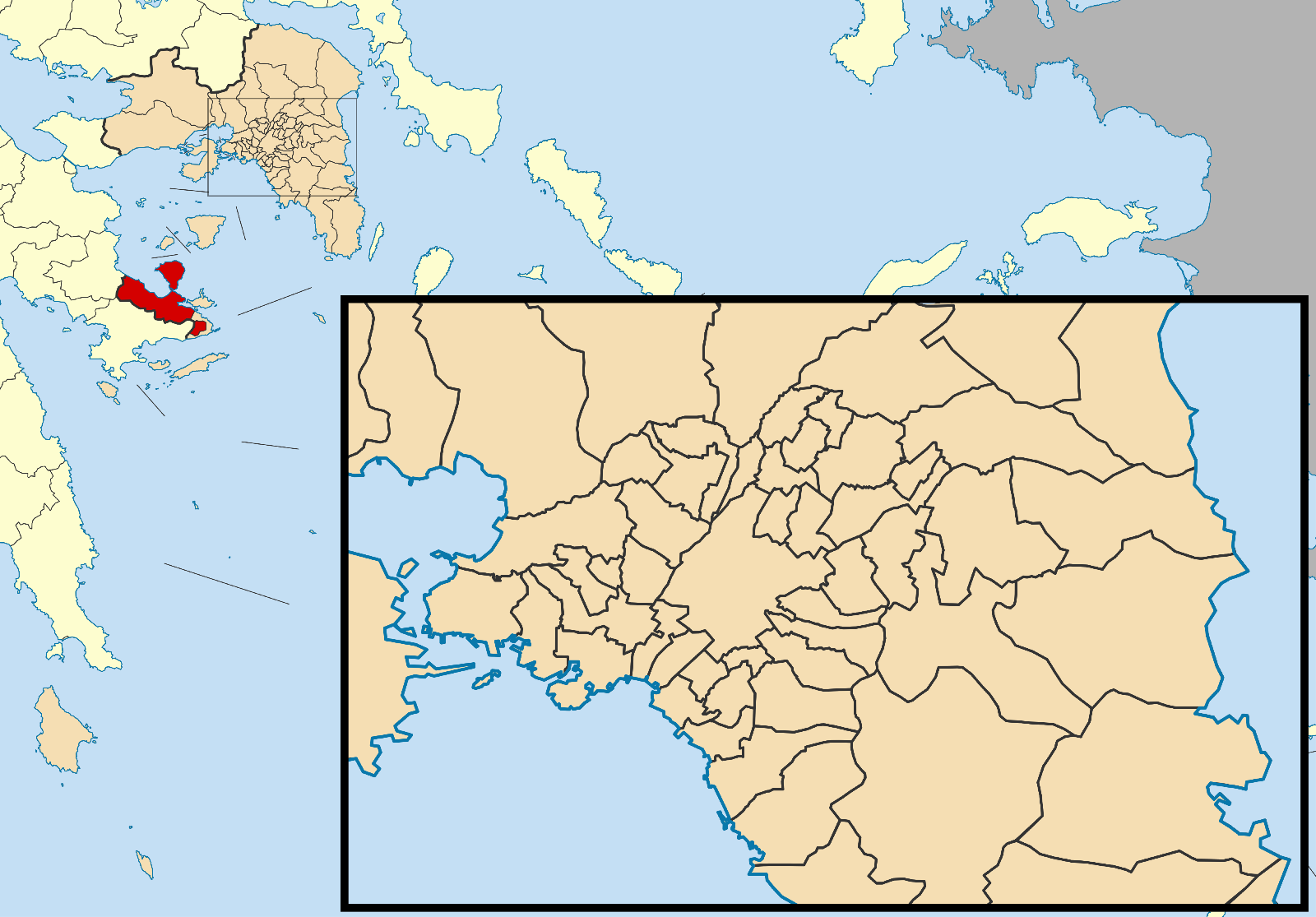

- Location within Greece
- Coordinates: 37°30′N 23°22′E
- Country: Greece
- Administrative region: Attica
- Regional unit: Islands
- Seat: Galatas

Government
  - Mayor: Anastasios Mougios (since 2024)

Area
  - Municipality: 240.86 km^{2} (93.00 sq mi)

Population (2021)
  - Municipality: 6,020
  - Density: 25.0/km^{2} (64.7/sq mi)
- Time zone: UTC+2 (EET)
  - Summer (DST): UTC+3 (EEST)

Troizinia-Methana (Greek: Τροιζηνία-Μέθανα) is a municipality in the Islands regional unit, Attica, Greece. The seat of the municipality is the town Galatas.

The municipality was formed at the 2011 local government reform by the merger of the two former municipalities Methana and Troizina, that became municipal units. Initially named Troizinia, in January 2014 the municipality was renamed Troizinia-Methana. The municipality has an area of 240.858 km^{2}.

== Province ==
The province of Troizinia (Greek: Επαρχία Τροιζηνίας) was one of the provinces of the Attica Prefecture, from 1964 to 1972 of Piraeus Prefecture and later again to Attica prefecture until today. Its territory corresponded with that of the current municipalities Troizinia and Poros. It was abolished in 2006.
