= Islands (regional unit) =

Islands Περιφερειακή ενότητα Νήσων
- Regional unit
- Municipalities of Islands

- Islands within Greece

- Location within Greece
- Coordinates: 37°20′N 23°30′E
- Country: Greece
- Administrative region: Attica
- Seat: Aegina

Area
  - Total: 897.6 km^{2} (346.6 sq mi)

Population (2021)
  - Total: 70,005
  - Density: 77.99/km^{2} (202.0/sq mi)
- Time zone: UTC+2 (EET)
  - Summer (DST): UTC+3 (EEST)

The Islands Regional Unit (Greek: Περιφερειακή ενότητα Νήσων, Periphereiaki enotita Nison) is one of the regional units of Greece. It is part of the region of Attica. The regional unit covers the Saronic Islands, a small part of the Peloponnese peninsula, and a few islands off the eastern Peloponnese coast.

== Administrative history ==
The municipalities and provinces of Aigina, Agistri, Poros and Salamis was part of the Attica Prefecture and was created in 1833 as part of Attica and Boeotia Prefecture. Hydra, Kythira, Spetses and Troizinia-Methana was originally part of Argolis and Korinthos prefecture until 1929, then part of Prefecture of Attica. In 1964 the newly formed Piraeus Prefecture (Νομός) was created incorporated the Islands which until then was part of Attica Prefecture, after the abolishment of Piraeus Prefecture in 1972 went back again to Attica Prefecture as part of newly formed Piraeus Prefecture (Νομαρχία). As a part of the 2011 Kallikratis government reform the regional unit of Islands was created as part of the Region of Attica.

== Administration ==
The regional unit of Islands was created as a part of the 2011 Kallikratis government reform. It is subdivided into 8 municipalities. These are:

- Aegina
- Agistri
- Hydra
- Kythira
- Poros
- Salamis
- Spetses
- Troizinia-Methana

== See also ==
- List of settlements in Attica
