= Agios Thomas =

Agios Thomas is the Greek name for Saint Thomas and may refer to the following places:

- In Greece:
  - Agios Thomas, Aetolia-Acarnania, a village in Aetolia-Acarnania
  - Agios Thomas, Boeotia, a village in Boeotia
  - Agios Thomas, Crete, a village in the Heraklion regional unit, Crete
  - Agios Thomas, Preveza, a village in the Preveza regional unit
  - Agios Thomas Diaporion, an uninhabited island belonging to the Saronic Islands
- Agios Thomas, Cyprus
