= Megara Gulf =

Gulf in the Aegean Sea

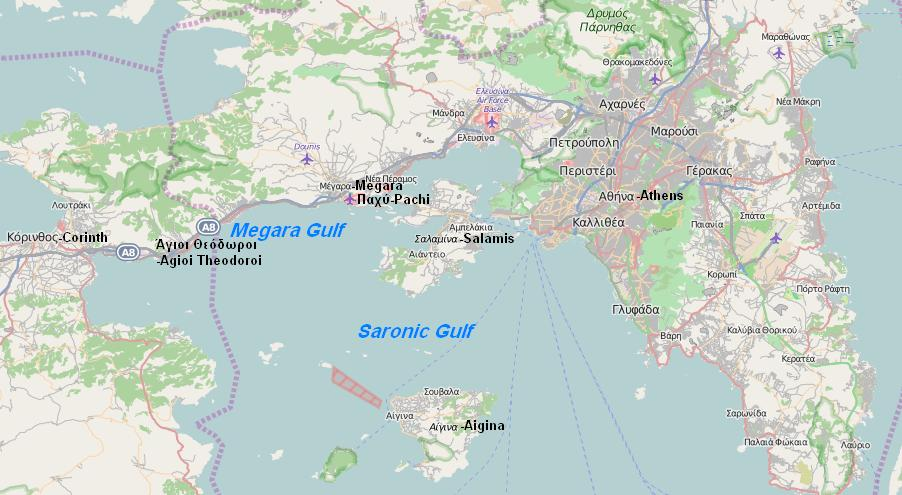
Megara Gulf in the map

The Megara Gulf (Greek: Κόλπος Μέγαρων, romanized: Kolpos Megaron) is a gulf in the Aegean Sea. It forms the northern section of the Saronic Gulf.

The total length of the gulf is approximately 20 km from north east to west, and it is about 6 to 10 km wide from north to south. It begins at Agioi Theodoroi and stretches eastward to the cape south of the village of Pachi in Megara and a small strait near Salamis Bay, and south to the area around Lamprino on the island of Salamis. Places on the shore include Agioi Theodoroi, Kineta, Pachi, and Kanakia on Salamis. Islets include Pachi and Pachaki (meaning Little Pachi) south of Pachi and Kanaki near Kanakia. Cape Petritis covers the southeast forming a bay boundary stretching to the northwestern part of the island near a small strait.

Farmlands and flatlands covers the northern part except for the area of Kakia Skala and mountains to the east. The road linking with places in the south of the island lie to the east and another further north.
