= Cave of Euripides =

Cave on Salamis Island, Greece

Coordinates: 37°52′55″N 23°28′4″E

The Cave of Euripides is a narrow cave, approximately 47 meters deep with ten small chambers, on a hillside overlooking the Saronic Gulf in the area of Peristeria on the south coast of Salamis Island, Greece. Its name derives from its reputation since ancient times as the place where the playwright Euripides came to write his tragedies. The ancient authors Philochorus and Satyrus described Euripides as a misanthrope who avoided society by lurking in a cave. The second century Roman author Aulus Gellius claimed to have visited the "grim and gloomy cavern" during his visit to Athens (Attic Nights XV.20).

== Archaeology ==
In the 1990s, excavations were carried out under the direction of Yannos G. Lolos, Assistant Professor of Prehistoric Archaeology at the University of Ioannina, Epirus, in collaboration with the Department of Palaeoanthropology of the Greek Ministry of Culture.

Finds date from the late Neolithic onward. They include stone implements and arrowheads; Mycenaean burials; 5th century BC Attic black glaze pottery; Roman period coins and votive figurines; and jewellery from the Frankish period, generally suggesting its long-term use as a place of refuge and worship. The most notable discovery was a fragmentary black-glaze skyphos dating from the late 5th century BC, with the letters ΕΥΡΙΠΠ, clearly part of the name Euripides, carefully inscribed in letters of the Hellenistic or Roman period. Lolos interpreted the cup as a votive offering to Euripides, confirmation of the devotion his poetry inspired in later periods.

Lolos also uncovered the foundations of a small rural sanctuary about 70 meters southwest of the cave, on the trail from the shore. Based on a marble phallus and other finds, he interpreted it as a sanctuary of Dionysus, the patron god of Greek theatre.

== Access ==
The cave, unsignposted, is located between the settlements of Peristeria and Kolones, about 350 meters northwest of the north end of Euripides Street, up a clear footpath. There is a steel door.
