= Salamis Bay =

Bay in Greece

Coordinates: 37.94°N 23.46°E

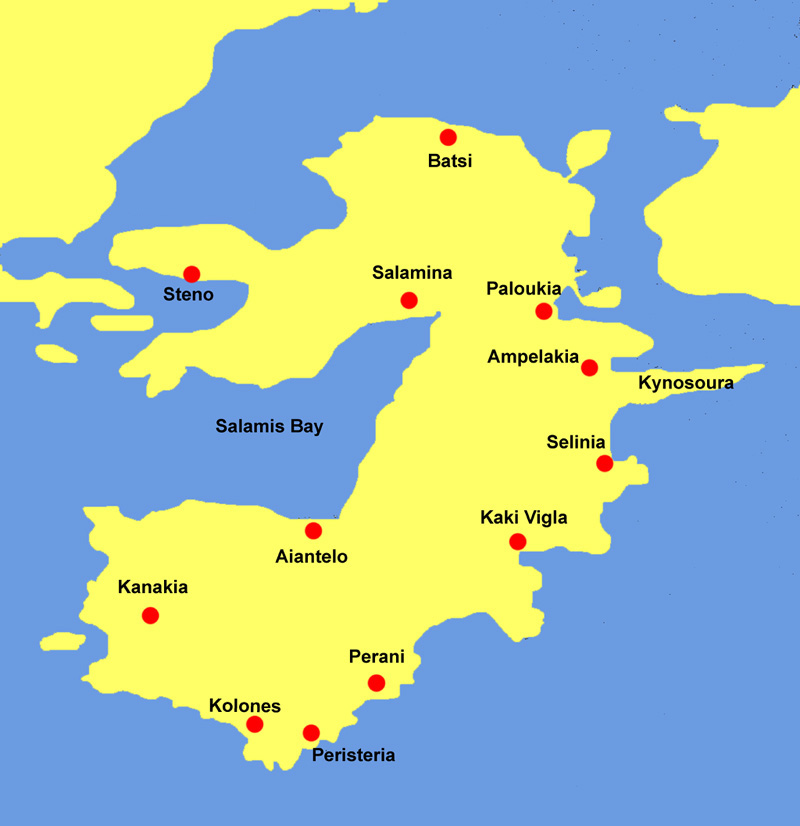
Map of Salamis

Salamis Bay (Greek: Όρμος Σαλαμίνος) is a bay on the west coast of Salamis Island, Greece. It connects with the Saronic Gulf to the west. Its maximum length is approximately 9 km from northeast to west. Cape Petriti forms its southwestern end. The main town of the island, Salamina, is on the northeastern end of the bay. The village Aianteio is on its south coast.

The bay is surrounded by steep hills.
