= Bogris =

Bogris is a surname. Notable people with the surname include:

- Georgios Bogris
- Dimitrios Bogris
