= Saron (mythology) =

Mythical Troezenian king

In Greek mythology, Saron (Ancient Greek: Σάρων, romanized: Sárōn) is a king of Troezen who gave his name to the Saronic Gulf. He was the third king of Troezen, following Althepus. His direct successor to the throne is not identified in surviving accounts.

== Mythology ==
Saron was a king of Troezen who succeeded Althepus, the previous ruler, to become the third king of the city. He was the one who built a sanctuary for Artemis Saronia by the sea, which was marshy and shallow and thus called the Phoebaean Lagoon. Saron was fond of hunting, so one day as he was chasing a doe and the animal dashed into the sea, he dashed after her. The doe kept swimming farther and farther, and Saron chased after it until he was in open waters. His strength failed him and he drowned, his body washed up by the waves at the grove of Artemis Saronia in the lagoon. The people buried him within the sacred enclosure, and the sea was renamed the Saronic Gulf after him in his memory.

== Culture ==
The aetiological myth of Saron attempts to explain the origin of a local name. A small town called Saron near Troezen and Saronia itself (another name for Troezen) were named after him as well.

During the second century BC, the a festival called Saronia was celebrated in honour of Artemis in the sanctuary. Aelius Aristides seems to imply Saron became some sort of sea-deity like Glaucus; based on that Henning Börm speculates that Saron might have originally been a god pursuing Artemis herself before being downgraded from a god to a hero over the centuries.

== See also ==
Other similar deaths in Greek mythology:

- Aerope
- Helle
- Corax

== Bibliography ==
- Aelius Aristides, Orations, volume II. Edited and translated by Michael Trapp. Loeb Classical Library 545. Cambridge, MA: Harvard University Press, 2021. Available online at Loeb Classical Library.
- Börm, Henning (2008). "Saron". In Cancik, Hubert; Schneider, Helmuth (eds.). Brill's New Pauly. Vol. 12: Prol–Sar. Translated by Christine Salazar. Leiden, Boston: BRILL. ISBN 978-90-04-14217-6.
- Grimal, Pierre (1987). The Dictionary of Classical Mythology. Wiley-Blackwell. ISBN 0-631-13209-0.
- Pausanias, Description of Greece with an English Translation by W.H.S. Jones, Litt.D., and H.A. Ormerod, M.A., in 4 Volumes. Cambridge, MA, Harvard University Press; London, William Heinemann Ltd. 1918. Online version at the Perseus Digital Library.
- Schmitz, Leonhard (1867). Smith, William (ed.). A Dictionary of Greek and Roman Biography and Mythology. London, UK: John Murray, printed by Spottiswoode and Co. Online version at the Perseus.tufts library.
- Stephanus of Byzantium, Ethnica, Stephani Byzantii Ethnicorum quae supersunt, edited by August Meineike (1790-1870), published 1849, with an English translation Brady Kiesling. Available online at Topos Text.
