= Agios Thomas Diaporion =

Island in Greece

Native name: Άγιος Θωμάς
- Interactive map of Agios Thomas Diaporion

Geography
- Coordinates: 37°48′37.30″N 23°14′46.40″E
- Archipelago: Diaporia islands
- Adjacent to: Saronic Gulf

Administration
- Greece

Agios Thomas (Saint Thomas / Άγιος Θωμάς ) is an island in the Saronic Gulf, located north of the gulf and northwest of Aegina, part of the Saronic Islands. It belongs to the municipality of Aegina.

The island can be reached by 45-minute ferry ride from Athens and a 20-minute ride from Corinth. In 2015, it was bought by Warren Buffett and Alessandro Proto for 15 million euros.
