= Giorgos Papasideris =

Greek singer, composer, and lyricist

- Born: Giorgos Papasideris; 14 September 1902; Salamis Island, Greece
- Died: October 8, 1977 (aged 75); Salamis Island, Greece

Giorgos Papasideris (Greek: Γιώργος Παπασιδέρης 14 September 1902 – 8 October 1977) was a Greek singer, composer, and lyricist. He was born on Salamis Island. After leaving elementary school, he spent his entire career working professionally in the field of traditional Greek folk music, producing many popular recordings. He died of a heart attack in 1977 on Salamis Island. In a district of Salamis City, named Alonia in the birthplace of Papasideris, there is a bust in memory of him.
