= Orus (mythology) =

Different characters named Orus in mythology

In Greek mythology, Orus (Ancient Greek: Ὦρος, accusative Ὦρον 'Horus') may refer to two different characters

- Orus, the "first to be born" in the land about the Troezen and also first king of that kingdom which was then called Oraea after him. He had a daughter Leis who consorted with the sea-god Poseidon. Their son Althepus succeeded Orus to the throne, and thereafter renamed the land as Althepia.
- Orus, an Achaean soldier who was slain by the Trojan Prince Hector during the siege of Troy.
