= Salamis Island =

Island in the Saronic Gulf, Greece

Salamis Σαλαμίνα
- Municipality
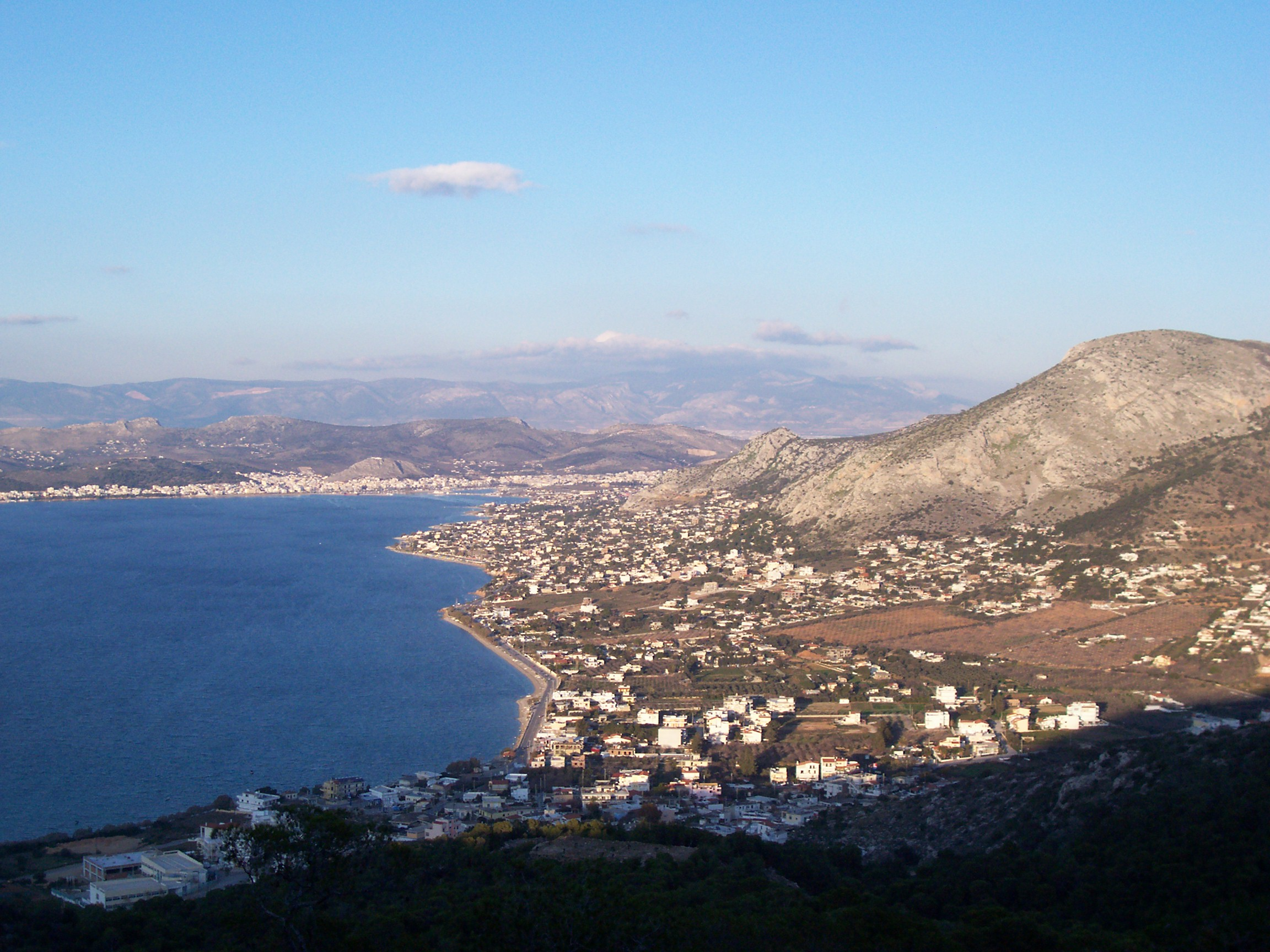
- View of Salamis

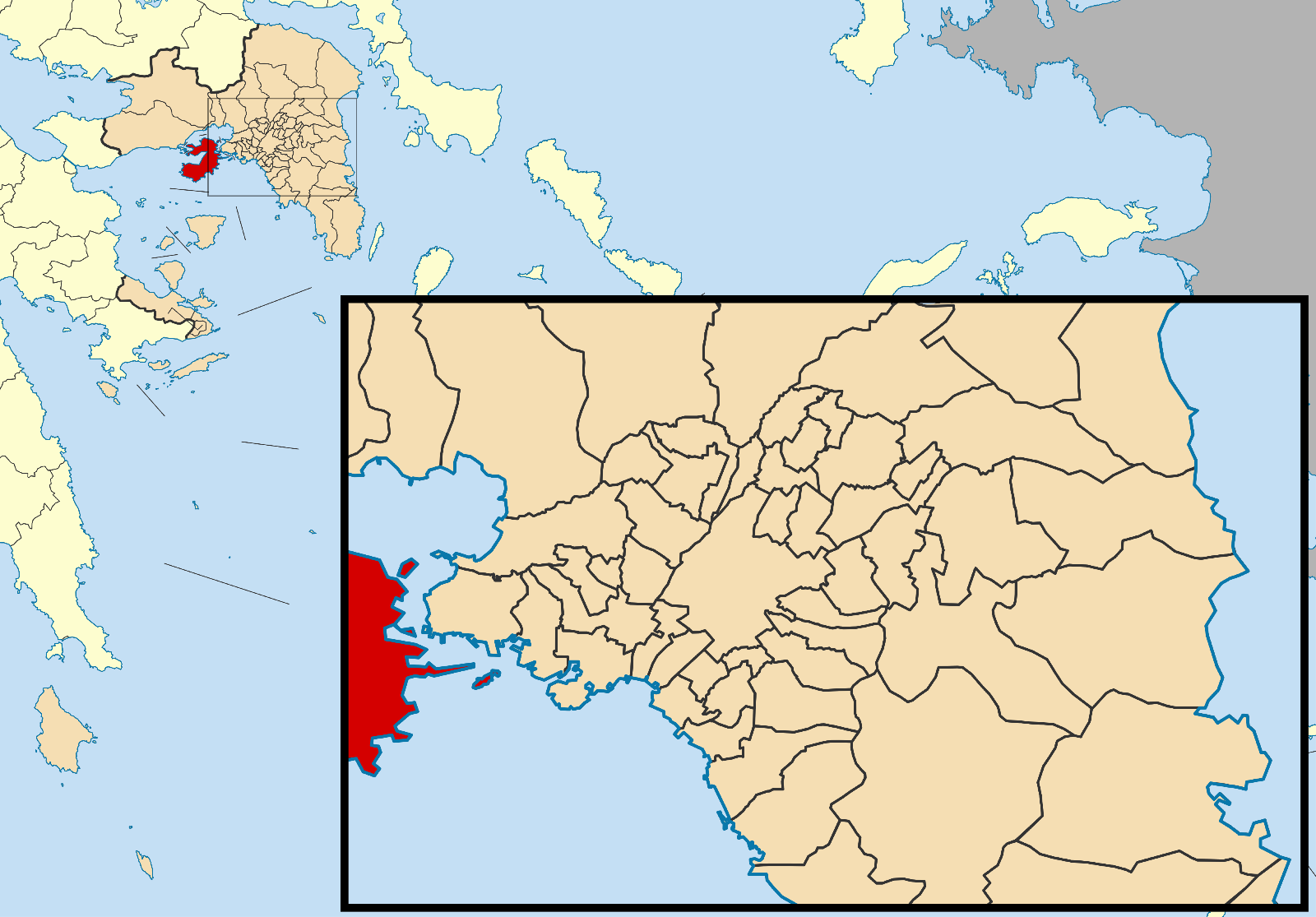

- Location within Greece
- Coordinates: 37°56′N 23°30′E
- Country: Greece
- Administrative region: Attica
- Regional unit: Islands
- Seat: Salamina

Government
  - Mayor: Georgios Panagopoulos (since 2019)

Area
  - Municipality: 96.16 km^{2} (37.13 sq mi)

Population (2021)
  - Municipality: 37,220
  - Density: 387.1/km^{2} (1,002/sq mi)
- Time zone: UTC+2 (EET)
  - Summer (DST): UTC+3 (EEST)
- Postal code: 189 xx
- Area code: 21
- Vehicle registration: Y
- Website: www.salamina.gr

Salamis (/ˈsæləmɪs/ SAL-ə-miss; Ancient Greek and Katharevousa: Σαλαμίς, romanized: Salamís) or Salamina (Modern Greek: Σαλαμίνα, romanized: Salamína) is the largest Greek island in the Saronic Gulf, about two kilometres (one nautical mile) from the coast of Athens' port of Piraeus and about 16 km (8 1/2 nmi) west of Athens center.

The chief city, Salamina, lies in the west-facing core of the crescent on Salamis Bay, which opens into the Saronic Gulf. On the eastern side of the island its main port, Paloukia, connects the island with Perama in the western part of Athens urban area through a frequent ferry line and is the second largest port in Greece in terms of passengers, after the port of Piraeus.

== Etymology ==
The traditional etymology of Salamis derives it from the eponymous nymph Salamis, the mother of Cychreus, the legendary first king of the island. A more modern theory considers "Salamis" to come from the root sal 'salt' and -amis 'middle'; thus Salamis would be the place amid salt water. A theory presented by Martin Bernal in his book Black Athena, which has been overwhelmingly rejected by orientalists, classicists and archaeologists, has attempted to connect the name to the Semitic root Š-L-M 'health, safety, peace', because of the well-sheltered harbor.

From at least the 13th century until the 19th century, the town, the island, and the bay of Salamis were called Koulouri (Κούλουρη), because of its round shape (κόλουρο). The ancient name was revived in the 19th century. The name Koulouri is still used informally for the town. The island is known in Arvanitika as Κȣλλȣρι ("Kulluri").

== History ==
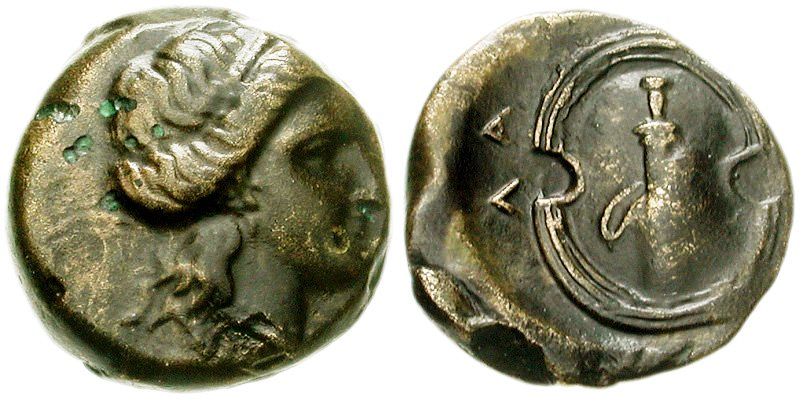
Coin of Salamis, 339–318 BC. Obverse: Female head. Reverse: Boeotian shield (shield of Ajax) and sword in sheath

Salamis was probably first colonised by Aegina and later occupied by Megara, but became an Athenian possession in the time of Solon or Peisistratos, following the war between Athens and Megara around 600 BC. According to Strabo, the ancient capital was at the south of the island; in classical times it was to the east, on the Kamatero Peninsula overlooking the Strait of Salamis; in modern times it is on the west.

According to Homer's Iliad, Salamis took part in the Trojan War with twelve ships under the leadership of Ajax (Aias)

Salamis island is known for the Battle of Salamis, the decisive naval victory of the Athenian-led allied Greek fleet, led by Themistocles, over the Persian Empire in 480 BC. It is said to be the birthplace of Ajax and Euripides, the latter's birth being popularly placed on the day of the battle. In modern times, it is home to Salamis Naval Base, headquarters for the Hellenic Navy.

Arvanites were recorded among the inhabitants of the island in 1688. They lived in poverty as most of the Arvanites in Greece at the time.

The oldest known counting board was discovered on Salamis Island in 1899. It is thought to have been used by the Babylonians in about 300 BC and is more a gaming board than a calculating device. It is marble, about 150 cm × 75 cm × 4.5 cm (59 in × 30 in × 2 in), and has carved Greek symbols and parallel grooves.

During the German invasion of Greece in World War II, the harbor was bombed by the Luftwaffe on April 23, 1941, sinking the Greek battleships Kilkis and Lemnos.

In the 1960s and 1970s, during the military junta period, changes in land legislation allowed the subdivision of land plots. This opened the island to massive unplanned and unregulated urban and suburban development, including many weekend homes, especially along the northern and eastern coasts. The lack of corresponding investment in infrastructure, combined with heavy industry, has led to sea and beach pollution on this side of the island. There are, however, ongoing initiatives such as help from the European Union's Cohesion Fund toward improving sewerage by 2008.

An oil spill occurred off the coast of Salamis Island in September 2017.

== Geography ==
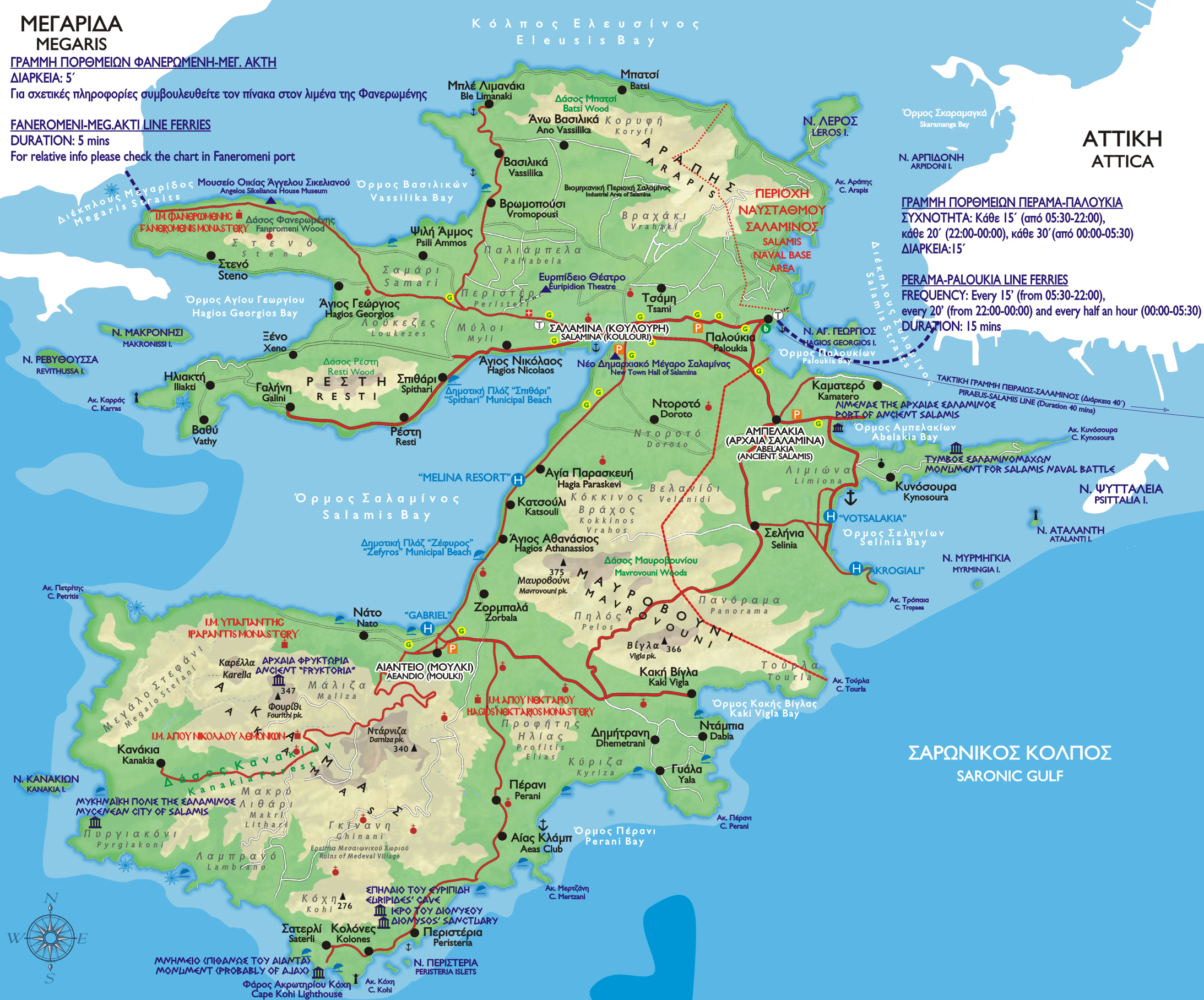
Salamina island map

Salamina has an area of 93 km^{2} (36 sq mi); its highest point is Mavrovouni at 404 m (1,325 ft). A significant part of Salamina is rocky and mountainous. On the southern part of the island a pine forest is located, which is unusual for western Attica. This forest is often a target for fires.

While the inland inhabitants are mainly employed within the agricultural sector, the majority of Salamis' inhabitants work in maritime occupations (fishing, ferries, and the island's shipyards) or commute to work in Athens. The maritime industry is focused on the north-east coast of the island at the port of Paloukia (Παλούκια), where ferries to mainland Greece are based, and in the dockyards of Ampelakia and the north side of the Kynosoura peninsula.

Salamina is very popular for holiday and weekend visits from Athens mainland; its population rises to 300,000 in peak season of which c. 31,000 are permanent inhabitants. This supports a strong service industry sector, with many cafes, bars, ouzeries, tavernas and consumer goods shops throughout the island. On the south of the island, away from the port, there are a number of less developed areas with good swimming beaches including those of Aianteio, Maroudi, Perani, Peristeria, Kolones, Saterli, Selenia, and Kanakia. However, tourism in the island could develop more. The island is currently partially restricted due to the presence of a naval base, and its proximity to the industrial port at Perama detracts from its appeal.

== Climate ==
According to the meteorological station of the National Observatory of Athens and Harokopio University, Salamina has a hot semi-arid climate (Köppen climate classification: BSh) with mild winters and very hot summers.

Climate data for Salamina
| Month | Jan | Feb | Mar | Apr | May | Jun | Jul | Aug | Sep | Oct | Nov | Dec | Year |
|---|---|---|---|---|---|---|---|---|---|---|---|---|---|
| Record high °C (°F) | 25.9 (78.6) | 21.4 (70.5) | 24.9 (76.8) | 32.4 (90.3) | 34.6 (94.3) | 39.3 (102.7) | 41.6 (106.9) | 43.9 (111.0) | 37.1 (98.8) | 31.9 (89.4) | 30.8 (87.4) | 22.5 (72.5) | 43.9 (111.0) |
| Mean daily maximum °C (°F) | 14.3 (57.7) | 15.9 (60.6) | 18.1 (64.6) | 21.9 (71.4) | 27.0 (80.6) | 32.0 (89.6) | 35.3 (95.5) | 35.1 (95.2) | 30.3 (86.5) | 25.1 (77.2) | 20.5 (68.9) | 16.2 (61.2) | 24.3 (75.8) |
| Daily mean °C (°F) | 11.0 (51.8) | 12.3 (54.1) | 14.1 (57.4) | 17.3 (63.1) | 22.2 (72.0) | 26.9 (80.4) | 30.2 (86.4) | 30.3 (86.5) | 26.0 (78.8) | 21.4 (70.5) | 17.2 (63.0) | 13.2 (55.8) | 20.2 (68.3) |
| Mean daily minimum °C (°F) | 7.8 (46.0) | 8.8 (47.8) | 10.1 (50.2) | 12.8 (55.0) | 17.4 (63.3) | 21.8 (71.2) | 25.0 (77.0) | 25.4 (77.7) | 21.7 (71.1) | 17.6 (63.7) | 13.9 (57.0) | 10.1 (50.2) | 16.0 (60.9) |
| Record low °C (°F) | −1.0 (30.2) | 0.5 (32.9) | 0.9 (33.6) | 4.9 (40.8) | 11.9 (53.4) | 15.4 (59.7) | 19.2 (66.6) | 20.6 (69.1) | 14.8 (58.6) | 9.9 (49.8) | 6.5 (43.7) | 2.7 (36.9) | −1.0 (30.2) |
| Average rainfall mm (inches) | 54.4 (2.14) | 30.1 (1.19) | 26.4 (1.04) | 21.3 (0.84) | 12.8 (0.50) | 21.6 (0.85) | 3.9 (0.15) | 2.7 (0.11) | 28.8 (1.13) | 24.8 (0.98) | 59.6 (2.35) | 50.9 (2.00) | 337.3 (13.28) |
Source 1: National Observatory of Athens and Harokopio University (Jun 2016 - Mar 2024),
Source 2: World Meteorological Organization

== Municipality ==
Salamina Island belongs to the Islands regional unit of the Attica region. Since the 2011 local government reform the island is administered as one municipality. Before, the island was divided into two municipalities, that became municipal units at the reform:

- Salamina
- Ampelakia

In the municipal unit of Salamina, which has a land area of 80.992 km^{2} (31.271 sq mi) and a 2011 census population of 31,776, the chief population centre is the city of Salamina (also called Salamis, Salamis City or Koulouris, pop. 25,888 in 2011), consisting of the districts Alonia, Agios Minas, Agios Dimitrios, Agios Nikolaos, Boskos, Nea Salamina, Tsami and Vourkari. Its second-largest town is Aiánteio (pop. 5,888). In the municipal unit of Ampelakia, which has a land area of 15.169 km^{2} (5.857 sq mi) and a population of 7,507, the largest towns are Ampelakia (pop. 4,998) and Selinia (2,509).

== Population ==
As of the mid-20th century, the majority of the inhabitants were Arvanite; a thing that changed during the past 20 years due to settlement of a lot of Athenians on the island to the degree that nowadays Arvanites are a fraction of the population, living mainly in the towns of Salamina, Ampelakia, and Moulki (Aianteion).

| Year | Salamina (town) | Salamina (municipal unit) | Salamis (island) |
|---|---|---|---|
| 1981 | 20,807 | 25,215 | 30,402 |
| 1991 | 22,567 | 27,582 | 34,342 |
| 2001 | 25,730 | 30,962 | 38,022 |
| 2011 | 25,888 | 31,776 | 39,283 |
| 2021 | 24,997 | 30,235 | 37,220 |

== Villages in the municipal unit of Salamina ==
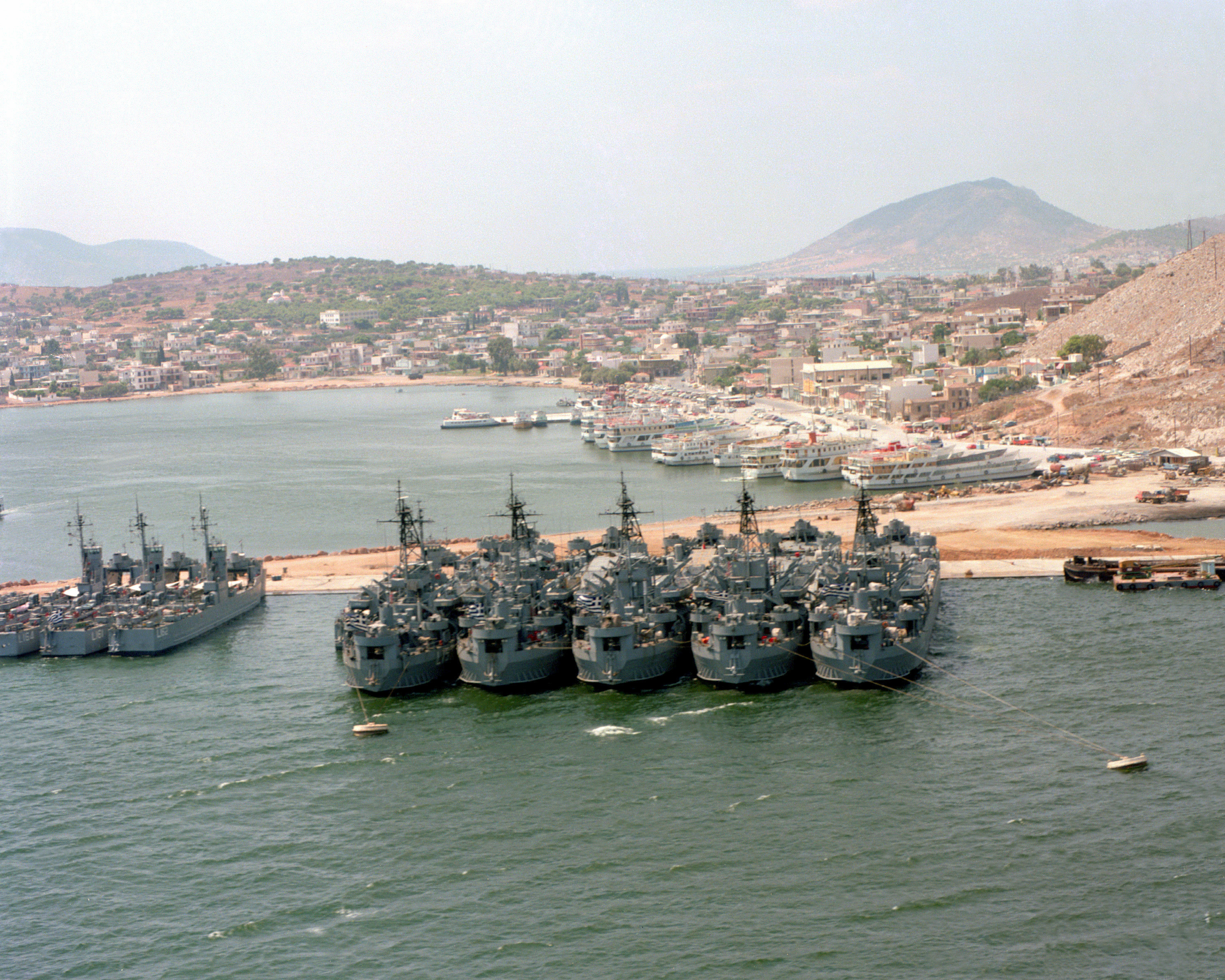
Salamis Naval Base

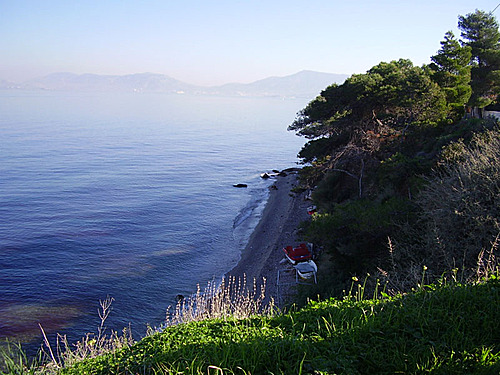
Batsi beach

=== Paloukia ===
Paloukia (Greek: Παλούκια) is located in the northeast of the island. Many ferryboats, fishing vessels and port police craft dock in this harbor. Paloukia is the base for the port police department of Salamina. Most visitors who come to Salamina first arrive at Paloukia via ferryboats that run between Paloukia and Perama or Piraeus.

The area is adjacent to the Salamis Naval Base (in Greek Nafstathmos), which is a major base of the Hellenic Navy.

=== Aianteio ===
Aianteio (Αιάντειο; population 4,390 as of 2021) is a large village in the southwestern part of Salamis Island and is named after Ajax, the leader of the Salamineans from Homer's Iliad. The village was known as Moulki (Μούλκι) until 1915. In the region, there are churches from the 11th and 12th centuries such as Saint John and Saint Dimitrios.

Interesting places to visit are:

- the oldest church in the island, Saint John the "Kalyvitis", which dates back to the 10th century and has remarkable hagiographies
- the monastery of Saint Nicolas which dates back to the 18th century and is situated in a forest.

=== Batsi ===
Batsi (Μπατσί; pop. 172) is a little community in the north of Salamis, in the municipality of Salamis, located at the foot of a piney mountain, about six to eight kilometres (3 1/2–5 mi) east of Megara.

In the mountain, there is a cave of archeological interest that has not been investigated yet. In the winter there are few tourists; it is more popular with vacationers from Athens during the summer months.

=== Kaki Vigla ===
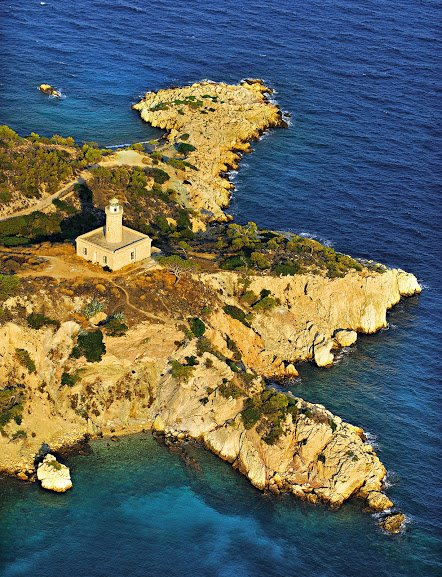
The Stone Lighthouse, 1901, Peristeria

Kaki Vigla (Κακή Βίγλα) is a small community located at the south of Salamis Island, near Aianteio.

The beaches of Kaki Vigla are relatively clean and the area has pine and olive trees near the shore.

=== Agios Georgios ===
A new village, founded in 1960.

=== Peristeria ===
Peristeria (Περιστέρια; pop. 191) is a small village in the southeast of the island 45 km (28 mi) from Salamis City. It took its name from the bird of peace, the dove (Greek: περιστέρι), because it is a calm, peaceful and isolated place, away from the cars and from noise. Another interpretation says that its name may be derived from the doves which were living and had nests in the area.

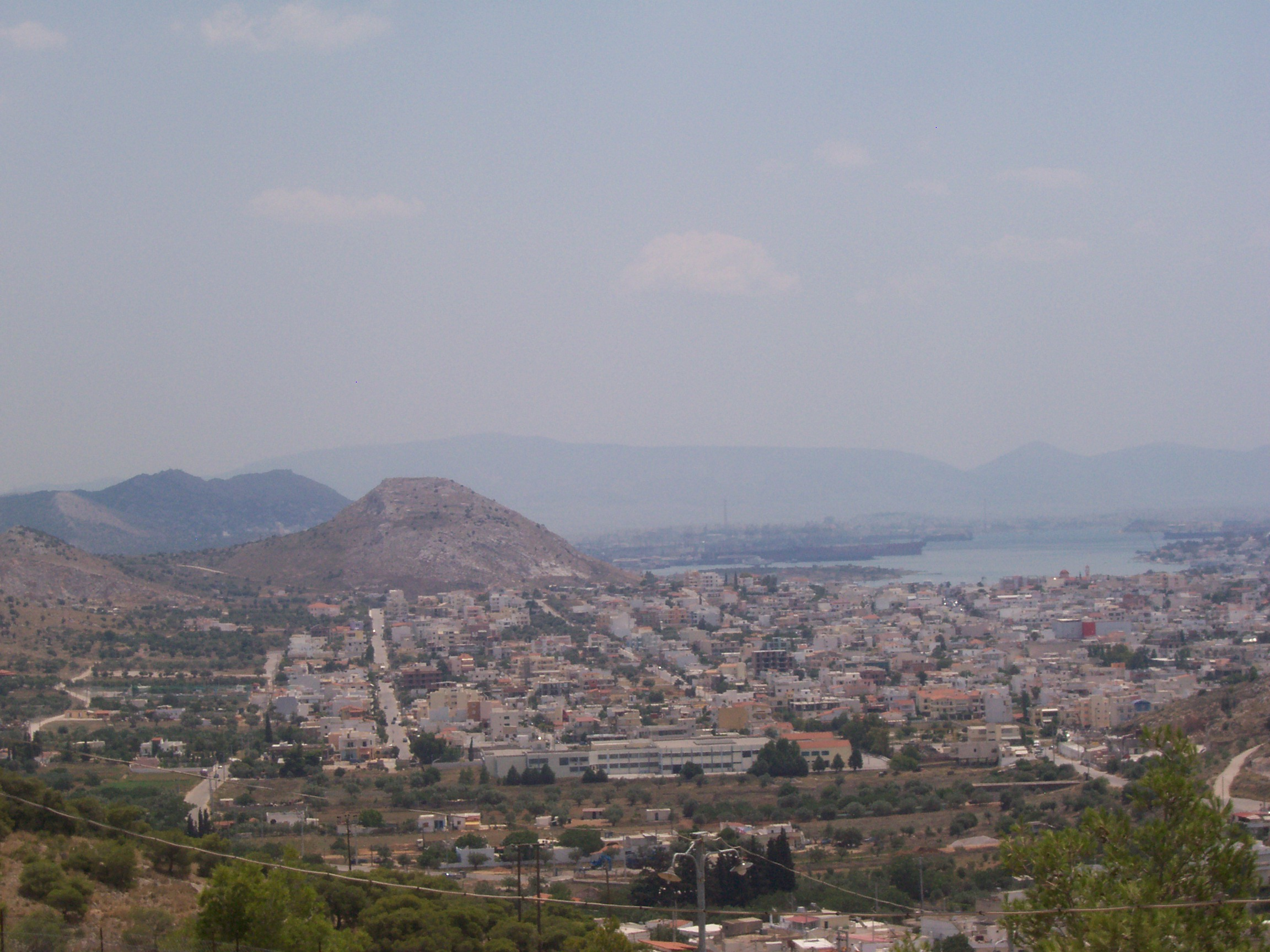
View of Salamina

The area has a marina, which has yachts and fishing boats. The beaches of Peristeria are the cleanest of Salamis. The village is near the Cave of Euripides, associated with the famous ancient playwright.

=== Psili Ammos ===
Psili Ammos (Ψιλή Άμμος), which means Fine Sand is so named because it is covered with sand. The area is located at the northwest of the island opposite of Elefsina. In the area there is one of the oldest landmarks, the chantry of Saint Grigorios (Saint Gregory).

=== Steno ===
Steno (Στενό, lit. 'narrow'; pop. 239), is a small community in the northwest of Salamis Island. The area is separated from Fanaromeni Monastery by a hill with shrubs and pine trees. The area is adjacent to the bay of Agios Georgios. Steno has wide and well-planned roads.

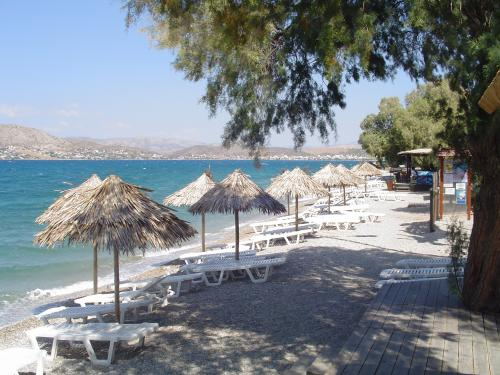
Aianteio Beach

=== Vasilika ===
Vasilika (Βασιλικά) which means Royal is a big village located in the northwest of the island. Vasilika is the third largest area in Salamis by population after Salamis City and Aianteio. Vasilika has a sandy large beach apt for swimming.

=== Xeno ===
Xeno (Ξένο, lit. 'foreign') is located in the northwest corner of the island. The area was so named because the first residents were not from Salamis but from nearby Piraeus.

== Villages in the municipal unit of Ampelakia ==
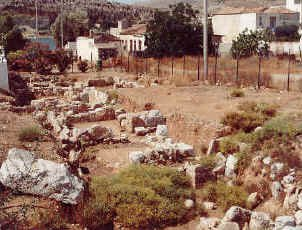
Ruins of ancient classical city and the port of Salamis (5th to 2nd BC) Ampelakia

=== Kynosoura ===
Kynosoura (Κυνόσουρα, lit. 'dog's tail'; pop. 58) is a small peninsula located in the east of the island. The name probably comes from the shape of the peninsula, long and thin and pointed at the end. In the south are a few houses. In the north are the remains of an ancient tumulus thought to be the burial site of Greek warriors in the Battle of Salamis. Nearby is a dockyard, which constructs and fixes ships including oil tankers and containers.

=== Selinia ===
Selinia (Σελήνια; pop. 2,376) is a resort located a few kilometers southeast of Salamis city. Selinia is the weekend resort of many Athenians due to its proximity to Athens. Selinia also features restaurants and taverns.

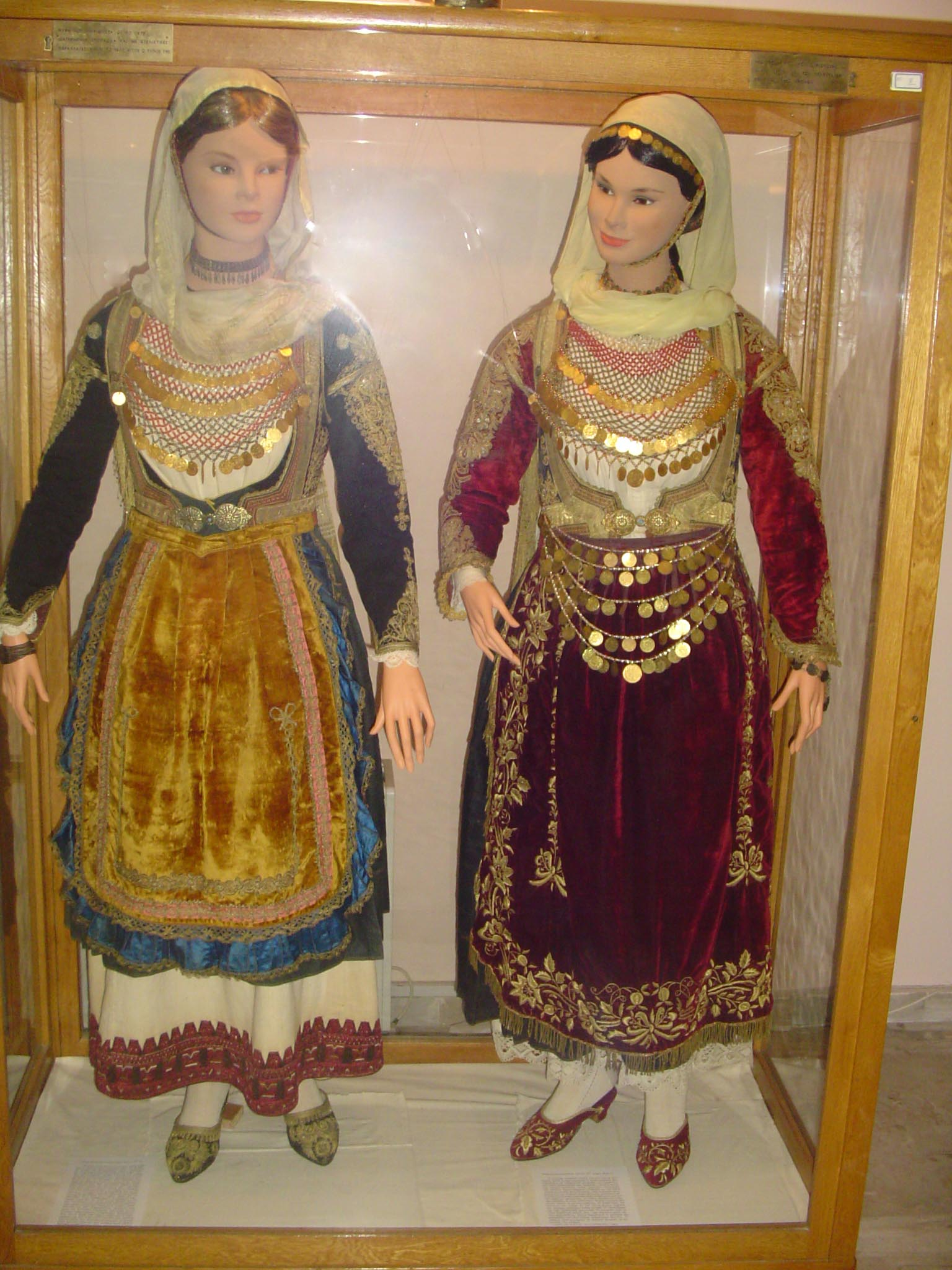
Folklore Museum & Salamina Municipal Library, in the town hall

== Culture ==
=== Education ===
Salamis island has eleven primary schools (ten public and one private), four high schools, and four lycees.

=== Recreational areas ===
In Salamis Bay, a visitor can find many bars, cafeterias, beaches, and shops. The main cafeterias and bars are based in Agios Nikolaos, which is located in the western suburbs of Salamis city. The district is named for the church. Taverns and inns, which are located throughout the island, feature local food and dishes.

=== Clubs, activities and organizations ===
The cultural activities that take place and the cultural organizations that operate in Salamina include: a Museum of Folklore Art and History, a Public Municipal Library, a Drama Club "Euripides" and a Dance Group "Erevna". Also, regional, traditional and seasonal festivals are organized throughout the year, indicatively: the Annual Festival, "Salaminia" (to commemorate the Naval Battle of Salamis), the "Fisherman's Festival" and the Carnival.

=== Sports ===
Salamis island has four football teams: Aias Salamina, Ampelakiakos F.C., A.E. Salamina and Salaminomachoi. In 2019 the Nautical Club "Agios Nikolaos" Yalas, became the Champion Sprint Canoeing Club of Greece, during the 23rd Greek National Development Sprint Canoeing Championship, winning 4 gold, 4 silver and 4 bronze medals.

=== Local newspapers and magazines ===
- Salamina-Press
- 30 Imeres tis Salaminas (30 Days of Salamina)
- Anatropes (Tippings)
- Apopsi (Opinion)
- Athlitikoi Palmoi (Athletic Vibrations)
- I Enotita tis Salaminas (The Unity of Salamis)
- I Nea Salamina (The New Salamis)
- I Foni tis Salaminas (The Voice of Salamis)
- Neo Ithos tis Salaminas (New Morale of Salamis)
- Palmos tis Salaminas (Pulse of Salamis)
- Politis me dikaioma (Citizen With Rights)
- Salaminiaki Protoporia (Salaminian Vanguard)
- Sports Week Salamina

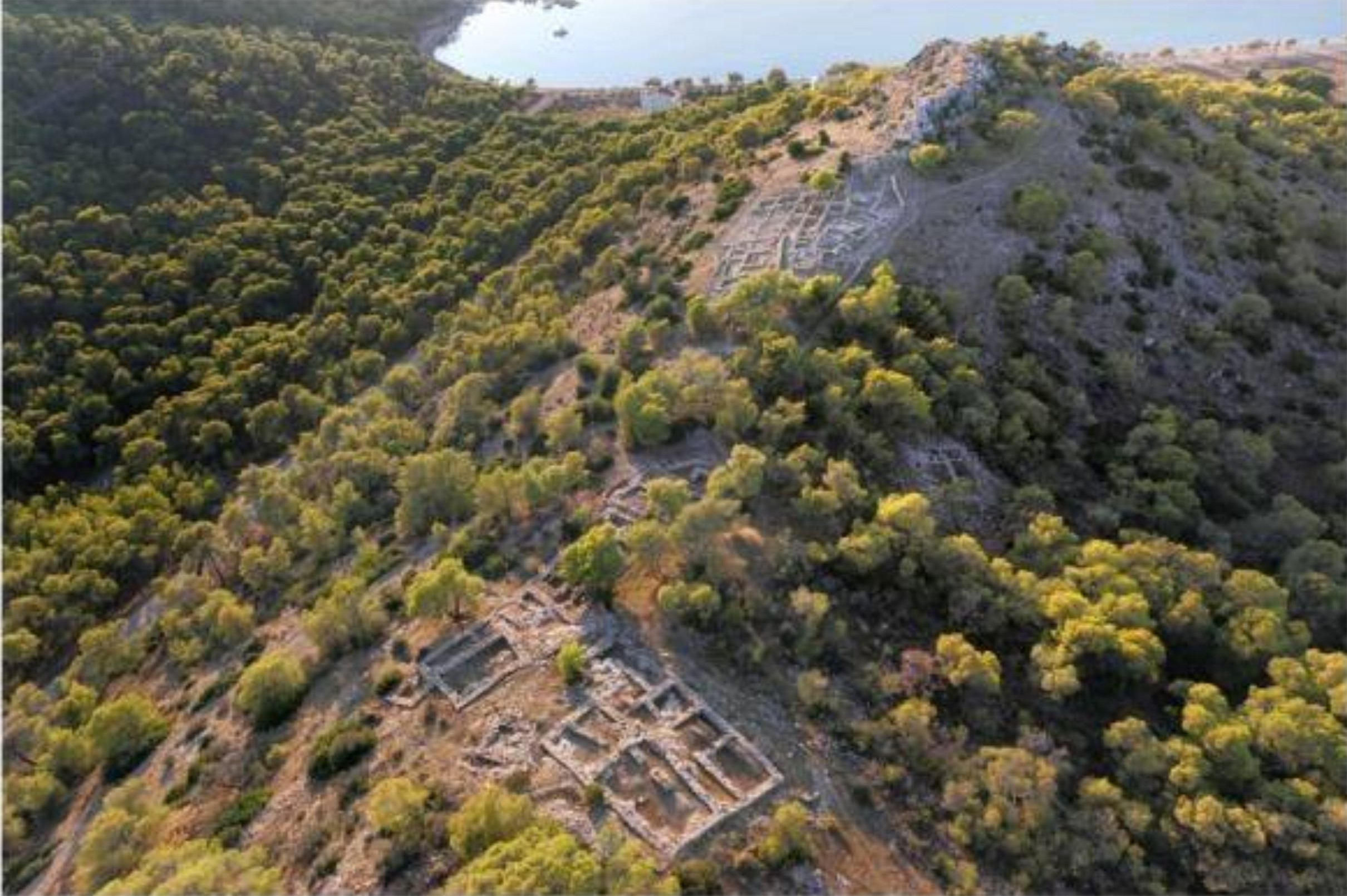
Mycenaean acropolis at Kanakia 13th century BC

== Landmarks ==
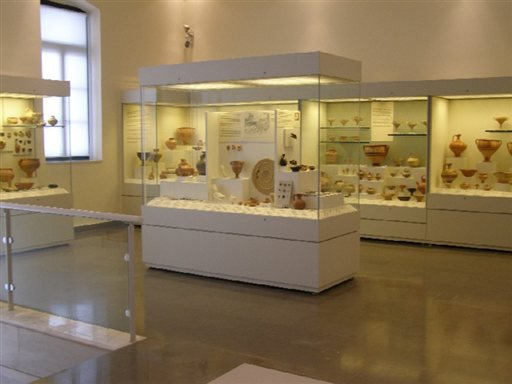
Archaeological Museum of Salamis

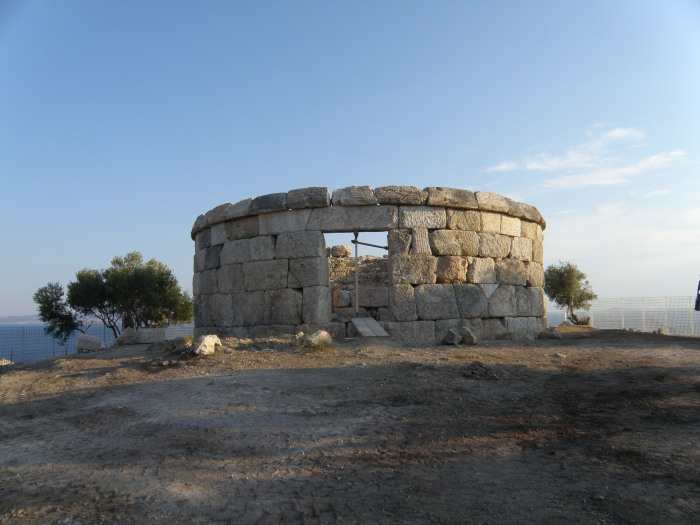
Circular funerary, 4th century BC in Kolones

| Landmark | Year of construction | Location |
|---|---|---|
| Faneromeni Monastery | 15th century | Faneromeni |
| Chantry of Saint George | 1250 | Agios Georgios |
| Mycenaean city of Salamis | 13th century BC | Kanakia |
| Ancient city and port of Salamis | 5th – 1st centuries BC | Ampelakia |
| Fighters tomb of the naval Battle of Salamis | 5th century BC | Ampelakia, Kynosoura |
| Circular funerary | 4th century BC | Kolones |
| Euripideio Theatre | 1993 | in suburbs of Salamis City (in hill Patris) |
| Church of Saint Dimitrios | 1806 | center of Salamis City (in hononymous district) |
| The Cave of Euripides | 450 BC | at south Salamis Island (near Peristeria) |
| The Cottage of Angelos Sikelianos | 1935 | Faneromeni |
| The Stone Lighthouse | 1901 | Peristeria |
| The bust of Georgios Karaiskakis | 1982 | center of Salamis City (in Vourkari district) |
| The Windmills | 19th century | in suburbs of Salamis City (in a hill) |
| Chantry of Prophet Elias | early 20th century | Salamis City (in a stone hill) |
| Chantry of Saint Grygorios | 12th century | Psili Ammos |
| The Stony small Theater | 1990 | Selinia |
| The City Hall of Salamis | 2000 | Salamis City |
| The Monastery of Saint Nicolaos | 17th century | at south Salamis Island (near Kanakia) |
| The Church of Saint John the Kalyvitis | 11th century | at south Salamis Island (near Kanakia) |
| The Folklore Museum | 2000 | lodging at Salamis City Hall |
| Archaeological museum of Salamis | 2013 | Salamis City |
| The Mansion of Galeos Family | 19th century | at Salamis center (at Agios Minas district) |
| The Church of Saint Minas | 1869 | at Salamis City (at Agios Minas district) |

== Notable people ==
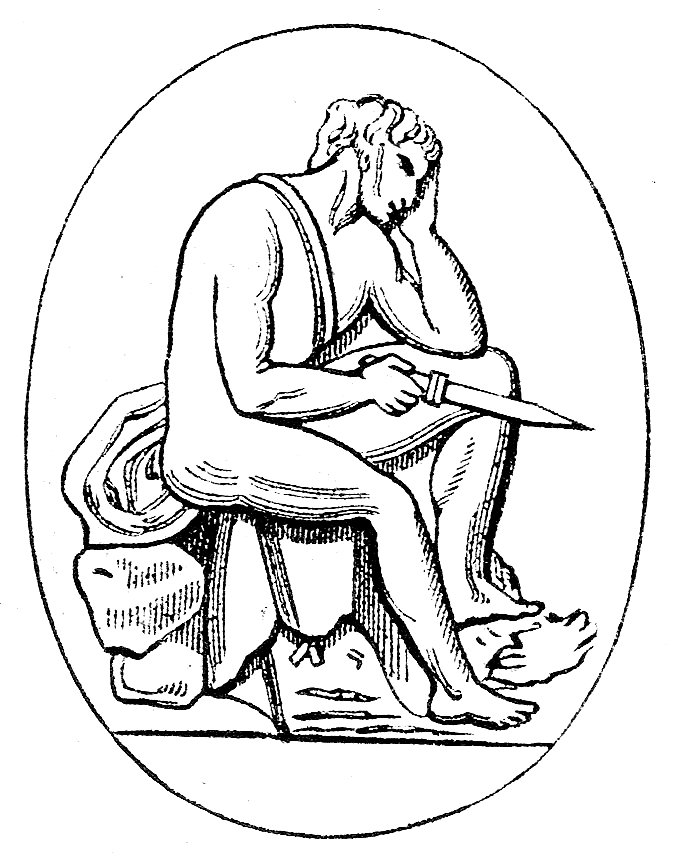
Ajax the Great

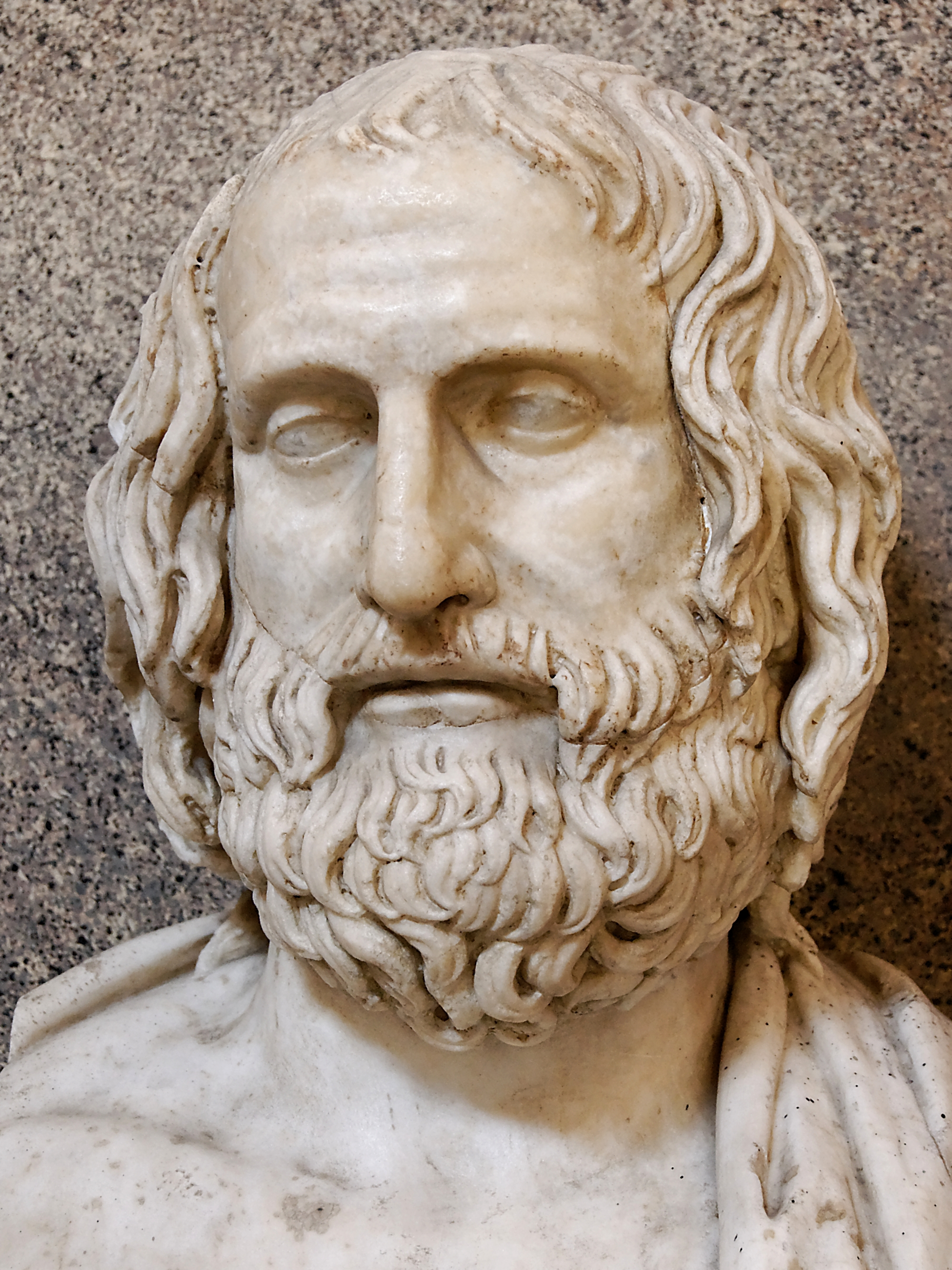
Euripides

=== Mythological and ancient people ===
- Ajax the Great, the legendary king of Salamis island, son of Telamon and half-brother of Teucer
- Cychreus, the first king of Salamis Island
- Euripides, tragedian (480 BC – 406 BC)
- Moerocles, orator (4th century BC)
- Telamon, the king of Salamis Island, father of Ajax the Great and Teucer
- Teucer, the half-brother of Ajax the Great, son of Telamon, warrior of Trojan War, and founder of the city-state of Salamis, Cyprus.

=== Modern people ===
- Georgios Karaiskakis (c. 1780–1827), Greek War of Independence hero, is buried on Salamis.
- Polychronis Lempesis (1848–1913), painter
- Anastas Kullurioti, publisher
- Theodoros Pangalos (general)
- Dimitrios Mpogris (1890–1964), playwright
- Giorgos Papasideris (1902–1977), country singer, composer and lyricist
- Angelos Sikelianos (1884–1951), poet and playwright, whose cottage was near the Monastery of Faneromeni.
- Memos Mpegnis (1974- ), actor
- Dimitra Fimi (1978-), academic and writer

== Twin towns / sister cities ==
Salamis Island is twinned with Famagusta, Cyprus (1998)

== Gallery ==
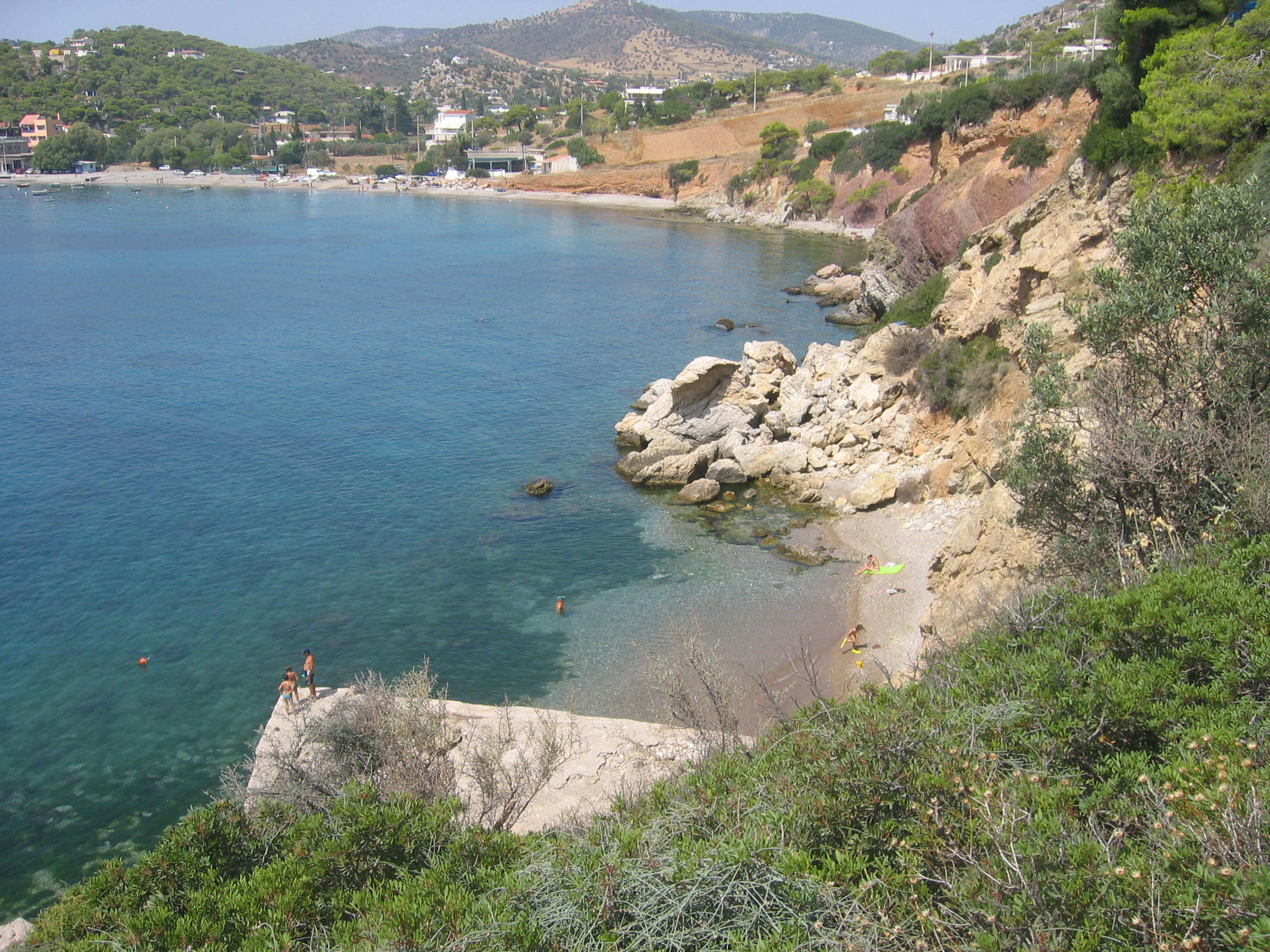
Kaki Vigla beach

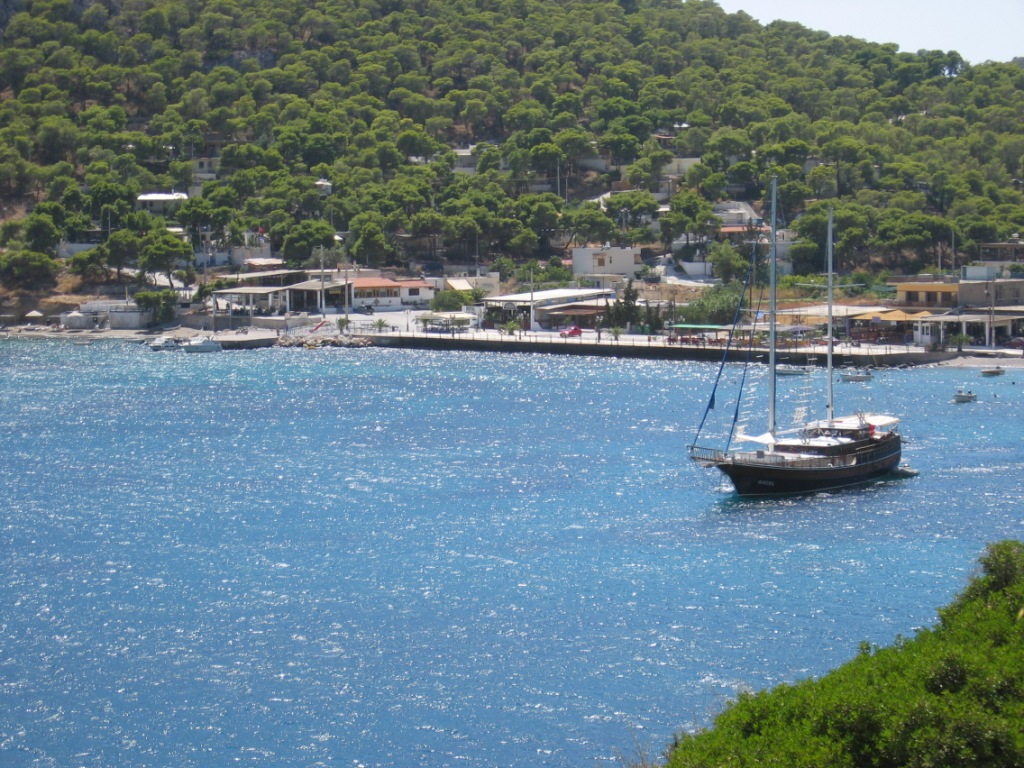
Kaki Vigla beach

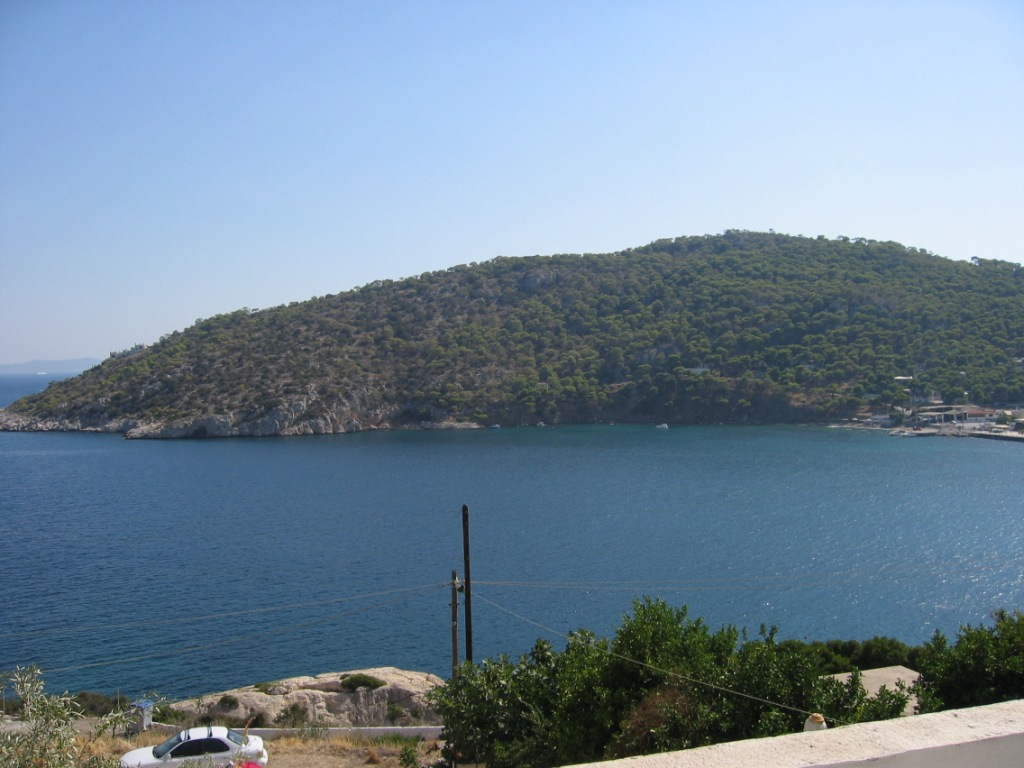
Kaki Vigla Gulf

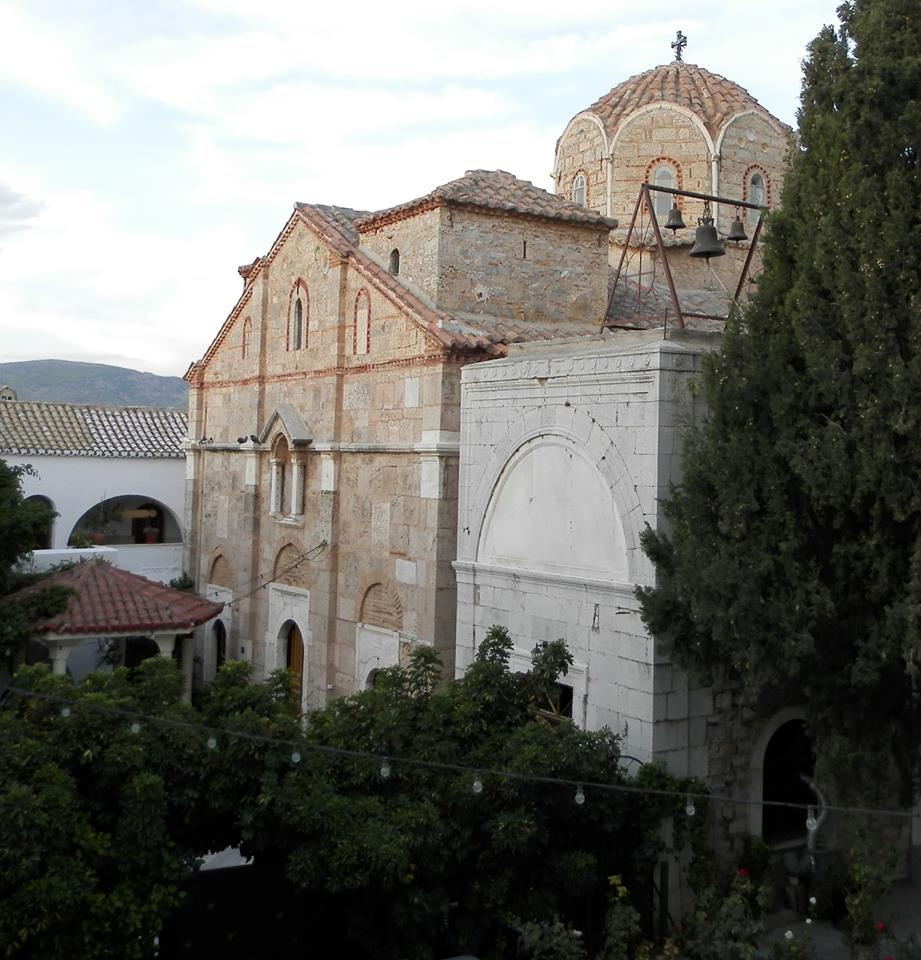
The historic monastery of Faneromeni

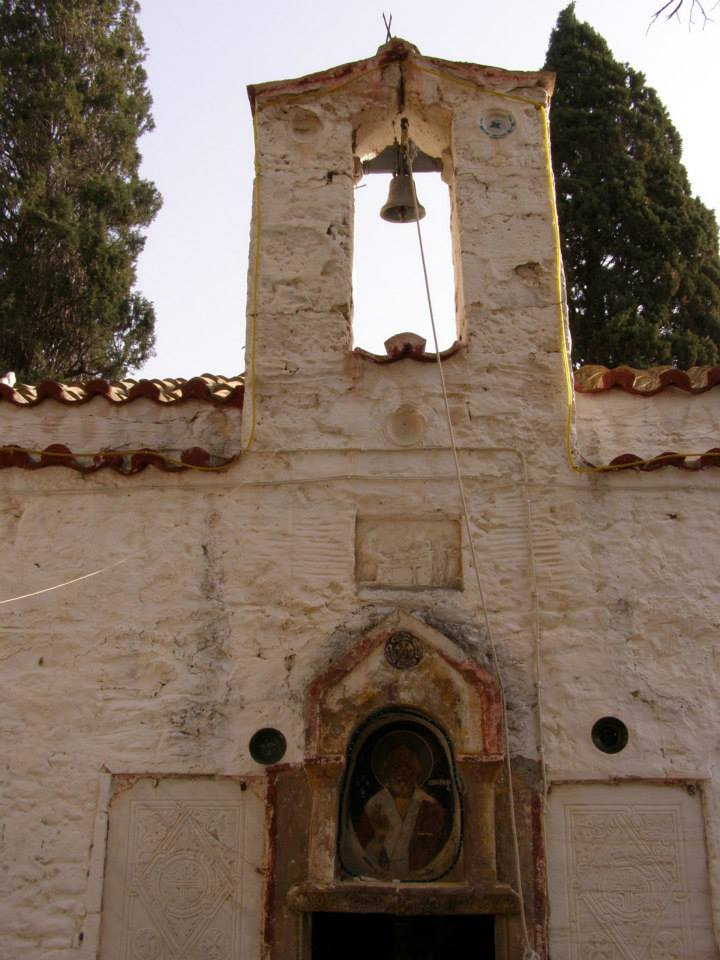
Nicolas Lemonia monastery 17th century AD, on the road between the villages Aianteio and Kanakia

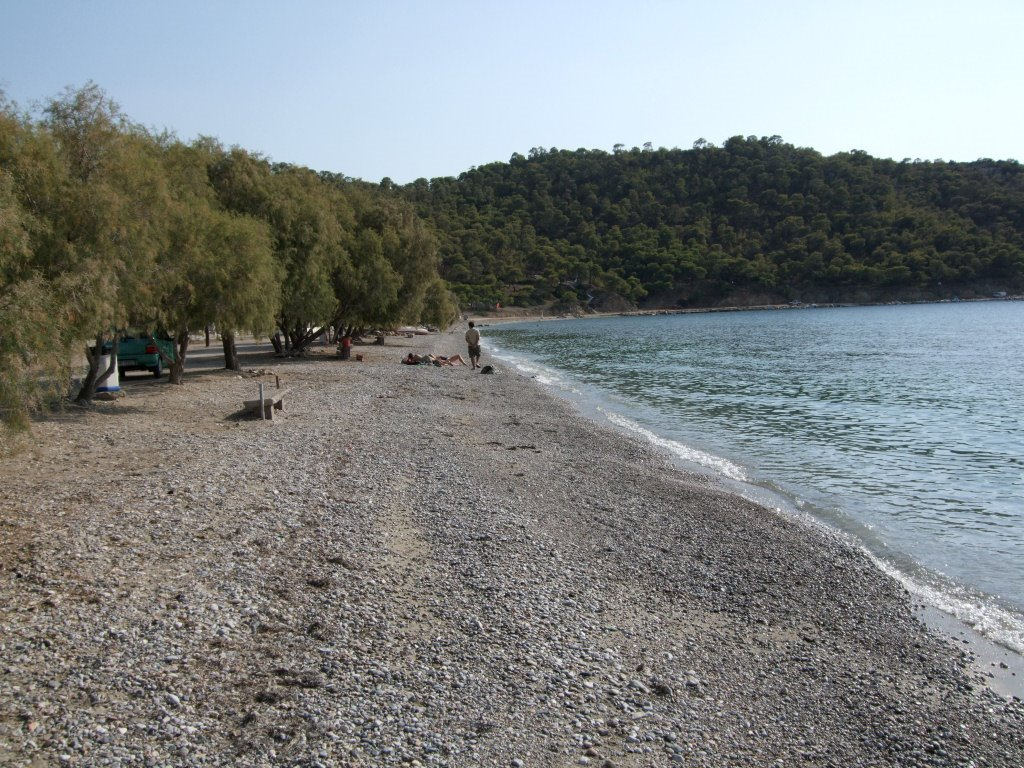
Kanakia beach

== See also ==
- Trojan War
- Greek Revolution
- Aeacus
