= Salamina, Attica =

Capital of the island of Salamina, Greece

Salamina Σαλαμίνα
- Municipal unit
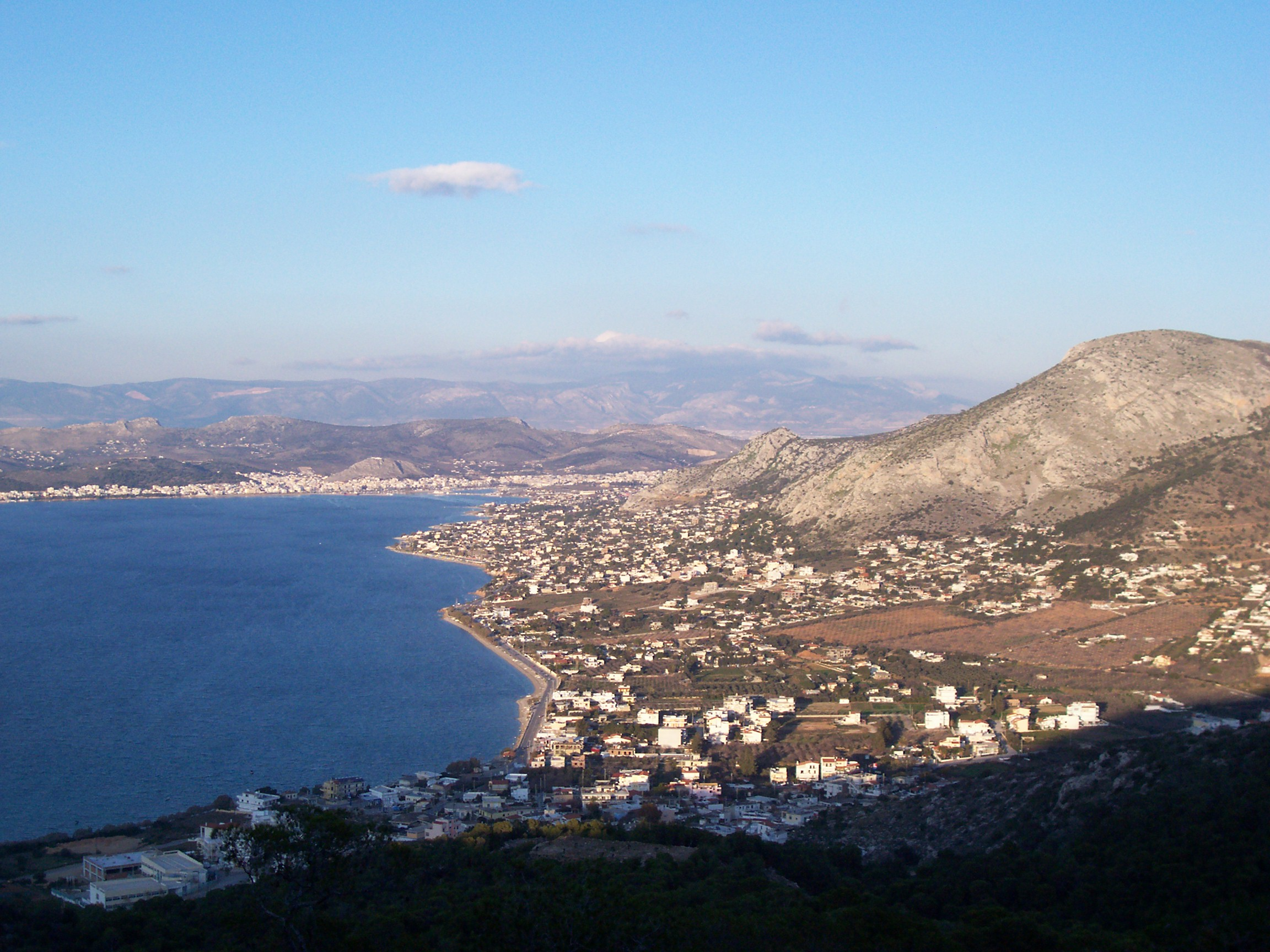
- View of Salamina

- Seal

- Location within Greece
- Coordinates: 37°58′N 23°30′E
- Country: Greece
- Administrative region: Attica
- Regional unit: Islands
- Municipality: Salamis
- Districts: 2

Area
  - Municipal unit: 80.992 km^{2} (31.271 sq mi)
- Highest elevation: 375 m (1,230 ft)
- Lowest elevation: 0 m (0 ft)

Population (2021)
  - Municipal unit: 30,235
  - Municipal unit density: 373.31/km^{2} (966.86/sq mi)
  - Community: 24,997
- Time zone: UTC+2 (EET)
  - Summer (DST): UTC+3 (EEST)
- Postal code: 189 00
- Area code: 21046
- Website: www.salamina.gr

Salamina (Greek: Σαλαμίνα, Katharevousa: Σαλαμίς, romanized: Salamís) or Kοullοuri (Greek: Κούλλουρη; Arvanitika: Κȣλλȣ́ρι/Kuluri) is the largest city and a former municipality on Salamina Island in Greece. Since the 2011 local government reform it is part of the municipality of Salamina, of which it is the seat and a municipal unit.

It is part of the Islands regional unit of the Attica region. The city lies in the northwestern part of the island. It had a population of 24,997 inhabitants at the 2021 census, some of them are Arvanites. It was the municipal seat of the former municipality of Salamina, which had a land area of 80.992 square kilometres (31.271 sq mi) and comprised about 84 percent of the island (all except the easternmost central coast, which comprised the former municipality of Ampelakia). The population of the municipal unit was 30,235 in 2021. It includes several towns, the largest of which are Aiánteio, Stenó, Kanákia, Peristéria, Batsí, Kolónes, and Pérani.

== Subdivisions ==
The municipal unit Salamina is subdivided into the following communities (constituent villages in brackets): Salamina (Salamina, Elliniko, Batsi, Steno) Aianteio (Aianteio, Dimitrani, Kanakia, Kolones, Maroudi, Perani, Peristeria)

== Climate ==
According to the meteorological station of the National Observatory of Athens and Harokopio University, Salamina has hot semi-arid climate (Köppen climate classification: BSh) with mild winters and very hot summers.

Climate data for Salamina
Month	Jan	Feb	Mar	Apr	May	Jun	Jul	Aug	Sep	Oct	Nov	Dec	Year
Record high °C (°F)	25.9 (78.6)	21.4 (70.5)	24.9 (76.8)	32.4 (90.3)	34.6 (94.3)	39.3 (102.7)	41.6 (106.9)	43.9 (111.0)	37.1 (98.8)	31.9 (89.4)	30.8 (87.4)	22.5 (72.5)	43.9 (111.0)
Mean daily maximum °C (°F)	14.3 (57.7)	15.9 (60.6)	18.1 (64.6)	21.9 (71.4)	27.0 (80.6)	32.0 (89.6)	35.3 (95.5)	35.1 (95.2)	30.3 (86.5)	25.1 (77.2)	20.5 (68.9)	16.2 (61.2)	24.3 (75.8)
Daily mean °C (°F)	11.0 (51.8)	12.3 (54.1)	14.1 (57.4)	17.3 (63.1)	22.2 (72.0)	26.9 (80.4)	30.2 (86.4)	30.3 (86.5)	26.0 (78.8)	21.4 (70.5)	17.2 (63.0)	13.2 (55.8)	20.2 (68.3)
Mean daily minimum °C (°F)	7.8 (46.0)	8.8 (47.8)	10.1 (50.2)	12.8 (55.0)	17.4 (63.3)	21.8 (71.2)	25.0 (77.0)	25.4 (77.7)	21.7 (71.1)	17.6 (63.7)	13.9 (57.0)	10.1 (50.2)	16.0 (60.9)
Record low °C (°F)	−1.0 (30.2)	0.5 (32.9)	0.9 (33.6)	4.9 (40.8)	11.9 (53.4)	15.4 (59.7)	19.2 (66.6)	20.6 (69.1)	14.8 (58.6)	9.9 (49.8)	6.5 (43.7)	2.7 (36.9)	−1.0 (30.2)
Average rainfall mm (inches)	54.4 (2.14)	30.1 (1.19)	26.4 (1.04)	21.3 (0.84)	12.8 (0.50)	21.6 (0.85)	3.9 (0.15)	2.7 (0.11)	28.8 (1.13)	24.8 (0.98)	59.6 (2.35)	50.9 (2.00)	337.3 (13.28)
Source 1: National Observatory of Athens and Harokopio University (Jun 2016 - Mar 2024),
Source 2: World Meteorological Organization

== See also ==
- Battle of Salamis
- Ajax the Great
