= Althepus =

In Greek mythology, Althepus (Ancient Greek: Ἄλθηπος) was a king of Troezen. Althepia named after him.

== Family ==
Althepus was the son of Poseidon and Leis, daughter of Orus, the former king of the land.

== Mythology ==
Althepus renamed the land Oraea, which he ruled, and called it Althepia. These are the former names of the land about Troezen. In the reign of this king, Poseidon and Athena contended, as at Athens, for the land of the Troezenians, but, through the mediation of Zeus, they became the joint guardians of the country. For this reason they worship both Athena, whom they name both Polias (Urban) and Sthenias (Strong), and also Poseidon, under the surname of King. Hence, a trident and the head of Athena are represented on the ancient coins of Troezen. Althepus was succeeded by Saron.
