= Ampelakia =

Ampelakia Αμπελάκια
- Municipal unit
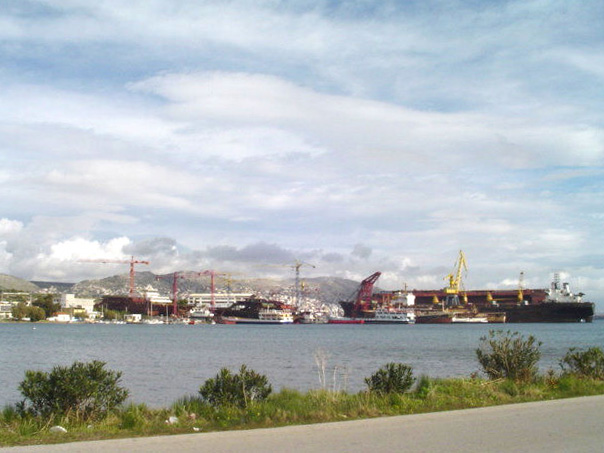
- Ampelakia

- Location within the regional unit

- Location within Greece
- Coordinates: 37°57′N 23°31′E
- Country: Greece
- Administrative region: Attica
- Regional unit: Islands
- Municipality: Salamis

Area
  - Municipal unit: 15.169 km^{2} (5.857 sq mi)
- Elevation: 5 m (16 ft)

Population (2021)
  - Municipal unit: 6,985
  - Municipal unit density: 460.5/km^{2} (1,193/sq mi)
  - Community: 4,609
- Time zone: UTC+2 (EET)
  - Summer (DST): UTC+3 (EEST)
- Postal code: 189 02
- Area code: 22980
- Vehicle registration: Z
- Website: www.ampelakia.gr

Ampelakia (Greek: Αμπελάκια, meaning vineyards) is a town and a former municipality of Salamis Island, Greece. Since the 2011 local government reform it is part of the municipality Salamis, of which it is a municipal unit.

It lies on the central east coast of the island and has a land area of 15.169 km^{2}, comprising about one-sixth of the island's area (with the balance belonging to the city of Salamina). It has a population of 6,985 inhabitants (2021 census).

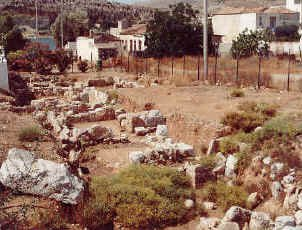
Ruins of ancient classical city and the port of Salamis (5th to 2nd BC) Ampelakia

== History ==
The city of Ampelakia has a long history. It was at Ampelakia Bay where the famous Battle of Salamis occurred in 480 BC, during which the Greek ships defeated the Persian fleet of Xerxes. Moreover, there are many remnants of the ancient town of Salamina which was a significant economic power between 350 and 318 BC when the town minted coins bearing the shield of the legendary hero Ajax. There are also churches which date back to the 16th century, for example the churches of St. John and St. Peter. Ampelakia was an important city in the Ottoman Empire due its lucrative yarn industry. This was until a collapse of the entire industry due to the importation of English yarn roughly worth one-third of regular Ottoman yarn. Ampelakia soon became a shadow of its former self and a microchasm for the entire Ottoman manufacturing industry as well.

Today Ambelakia is a nice city for a walk. The majority of the citizens are sailors. However, excavations are taking place at the ancient port, which is full of shipwrecks of old ships from the last 20 years. There are also a couple of large ship repair yards at Ambelakia. There is an effort by the Greek government to clean up the port and continue the excavations but the shipyard owners are against it because they would have to move. The biggest supermarket in the area is AB Vassilopoulos.

== Geography ==
Much of the area is made up of rocky landscapes with a few bushes, while some farmlands lie within the sea. The rest of the area is made up of residential areas. A panorama of the Attica peninsula including the Piraeus part of Athens can be seen during clear days.

== Historical population ==
Year	Community population	Municipal unit population
1981	4,180	5,187
1991	4,174	6,760
2001	4,596	6,552
2011	4,998	7,507
2021	4,609	6,985

== Subdivisions ==
The municipal unit Ampelakia is subdivided into the following communities (constituent villages in brackets):

- Ampelakia (Ampelakia, Kynosoura, Spithari)
- Selinia

== See also ==
- Battle of Salamis
- Ajax the Great
