= Agios Thomas, Preveza =

Coordinates: 38.9753°N 20.7881°E

Agios Thomas (Greek: Άγιος Θωμάς) is a coastal settlement at the southernmost tip of the prefecture of Preveza in Greece. It is approximately 6 km and is set in an agricultural area, but also has a busy harbour.

In 1919, the settlement was annexed to the municipality of Preveza, but 15 years later, in 1934, this decision was reversed, and it was designated as the seat of the community of Agios Thomas. In 1938, however, it was once again annexed to the municipality of Preveza.

== Taverns ==
There are four taverns and one cafe. Savvas is the largest popular tavern in the village for family events due to its view over the harbour. Daliani is not as large a tavern as Savvas nor does it offer the same view of the harbor. The third tavern is on the seafront, and the last tavern is on the road out to Agioi Apostoloi and Skafedaki. Inhabitants of nearby Preveza frequently visit the village.
