= Leis (mythology) =

Greek myth

In Greek mythology, Leis (Ancient Greek: Ληίς, romanized: Lēís, lit. 'booty, spoil') was a princess as daughter of King Orus of Oraea (former name of Troezen). By the sea god Poseidon, she became the mother of Althepus who inherited the kingdom and renamed it after him, Althepia.
