= Dimitrios Bogris =

Greek playwright of Hellenic theater

Dimitrios Mpogris
- Born: Dimitrios Bogris; 1890; Salamis Island, Greece
- Died: 1964 (aged 73–74); Athens, Greece

Dimitrios Bogris (Greek: Δημήτριος Μπόγρης; 1890 Salamis Island – 1964 Athens) was a famous Greek playwright of Hellenic theater. He was born in Salamis Island in 1890. He studied natural sciences in Athens and Paris. For one year, he was a professor in secondary education, but rapidly he devoted his time and passions to journalism.

His first play was Giatros Mavridis (Doctor Mavridis); it was produced in 1921 in the royal Hellenic theatre. Four years later wrote the Arravoniasmata (Engagements), which was played in 1936. With this play was proved one of the greatest playwrights of Greece.

Other plays were: Drakaina (Ogress) in 1928, to Bourini (the Squall) in 1933, i Kainourgia zoi (the New lIfe) in 1936, oi Fouskothalassies (the Ground swells) in 1937, to Koritsi tou limaniou (the Girl of port) in 1947, which became movie and screened by Greek Cinema in 1952. He died in Athens in 1964.

The former mayor of Salamis, Athanasios Makris, named a chamber of Salamis City Hall with the name of Dimitrios Bogris.
