= Agioi Apostoloi =

Island in Greece

Native name: Άγιοι Απόστολοι
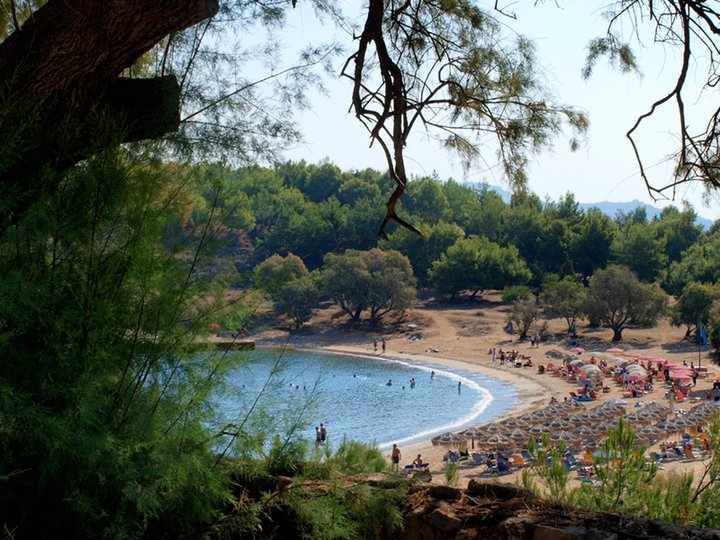
- Interactive map of Agioi Apostoloi

Geography
- Coordinates: 35°31′09″N 23°59′59″E
- Archipelago: Cretan Islands

Administration
- Greece
- Region: Crete
- Regional unit: Chania

Demographics
- Population: 0 (2001)

Agioi Apostoloi (Greek: Άγιοι Απόστολοι, "Holy Apostles") is an uninhabited islet to the north of the western coast of Crete in the Aegean Sea. Administratively, it is within the municipality of Chania, in Chania regional unit.

== See also ==
- List of islands of Greece
