= Agios Thomas, Cyprus =

Agios Thomas
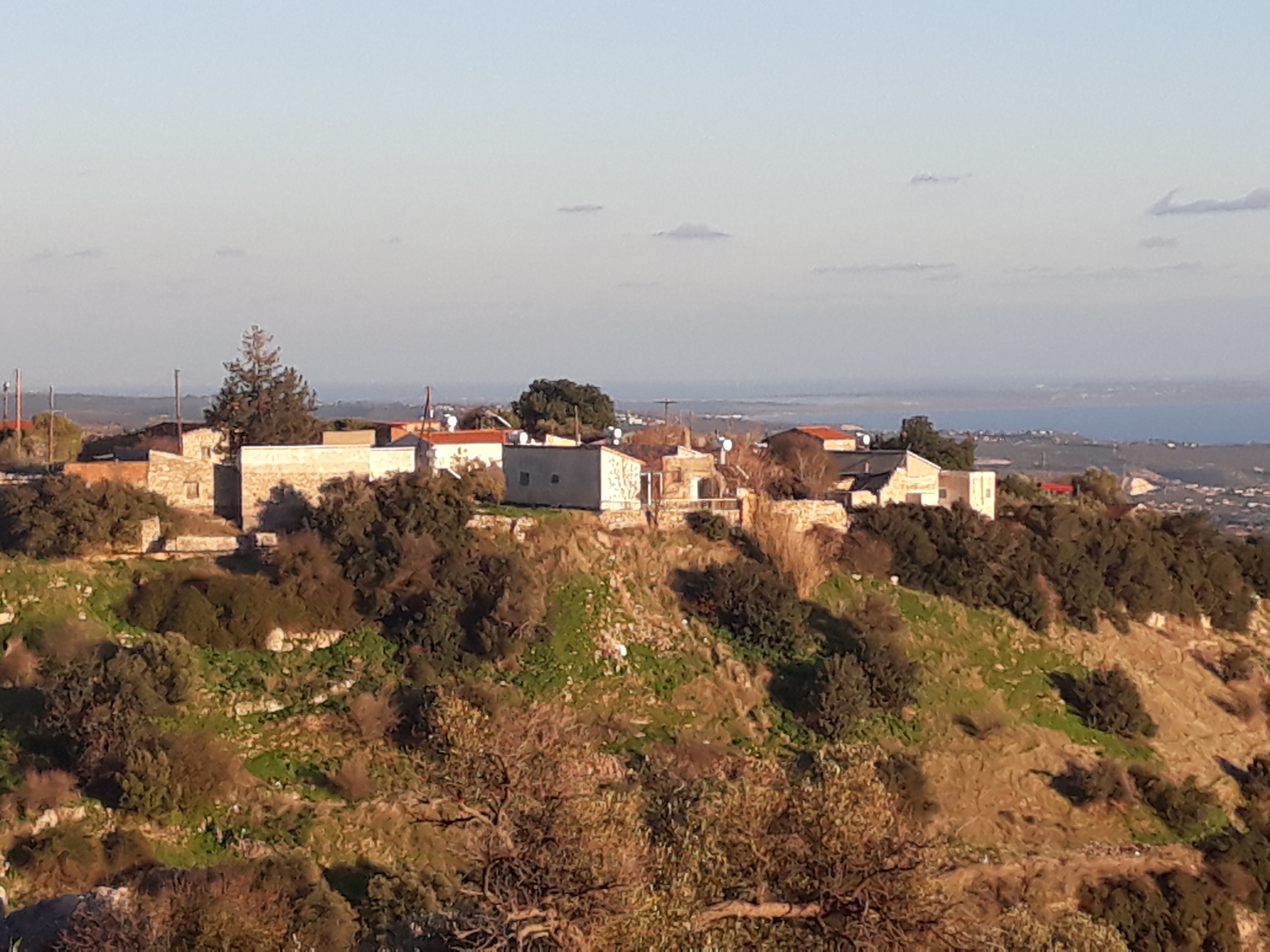

- Location within Cyprus
- Coordinates: 34°42′58″N 32°43′29″E
- Country: Cyprus
- District: Limassol District

Population (2011)
  - Total: 50
- Time zone: UTC+2 (EET)
  - Summer (DST): UTC+3 (EEST)

Agios Thomas (Greek: Άγιος Θωμάς; Turkish: Mersinli) is a village in the Limassol District of Cyprus, located 5 km northwest of Avdimou.

Until 1974, Agios Thomas had an exclusively Turkish Cypriot population. In July 1974, the village's inhabitants fled to Akrotiri. They were transported to Northern Cyprus via Turkey in January 1975, and most of them resettled in Kontea.
