= Harokopio University =

Public research university in Greece

Harokopio University of Athens
- Χαροκόπειο Πανεπιστήμιο
- Type: Public higher education institution
- Established: 1990; 36 years ago
- Rector: Georgios Dedoussis
- Total staff: 300
- Students: 3,214 (2021)
- Location: Kallithea, Athens, Greece; 37°57′40″N 23°42′30″E
- Nickname: HUA
- Website: www.hua.gr/en/

Harokopio University of Athens, HUA (Greek: Χαροκόπειο Πανεπιστήμιο) is a public research university based in Kallithea, Athens, Greece.

Founded in 1990, the 18th state University established in Greece, as the successor of the Harokopios Higher School of Home Economics (Greek: Χαροκόπειος Ανωτάτη Σχολή) that was established in 1929. The university has ever since expanded to further scientific areas awarding bachelor's, master's, as well as doctoral degrees. Its small size, with about 120 academic and research staff, 80 administration personnel and 1000 undergraduate students, makes it a flexible academic institution.

== History ==
The university is named after Panagis Harokopos (1835–1911), who took care of the founding and funding of a school oriented towards the production of scientific potential in Home Economics. To achieve his vision he bought a plot of 20,000 m^{2} in the borough of Kallithea, where between 1915 and 1920 the school was built. A new wing was added in 1959.

This complex of buildings housed the "Harokopios Higher School" until 1990, when the Harokopio University was founded. The development of the university was based on international standards and scientific research that was conducted by the Institute of Regional Development of the Panteion University after request of the Ministry of Education.

== Campus ==
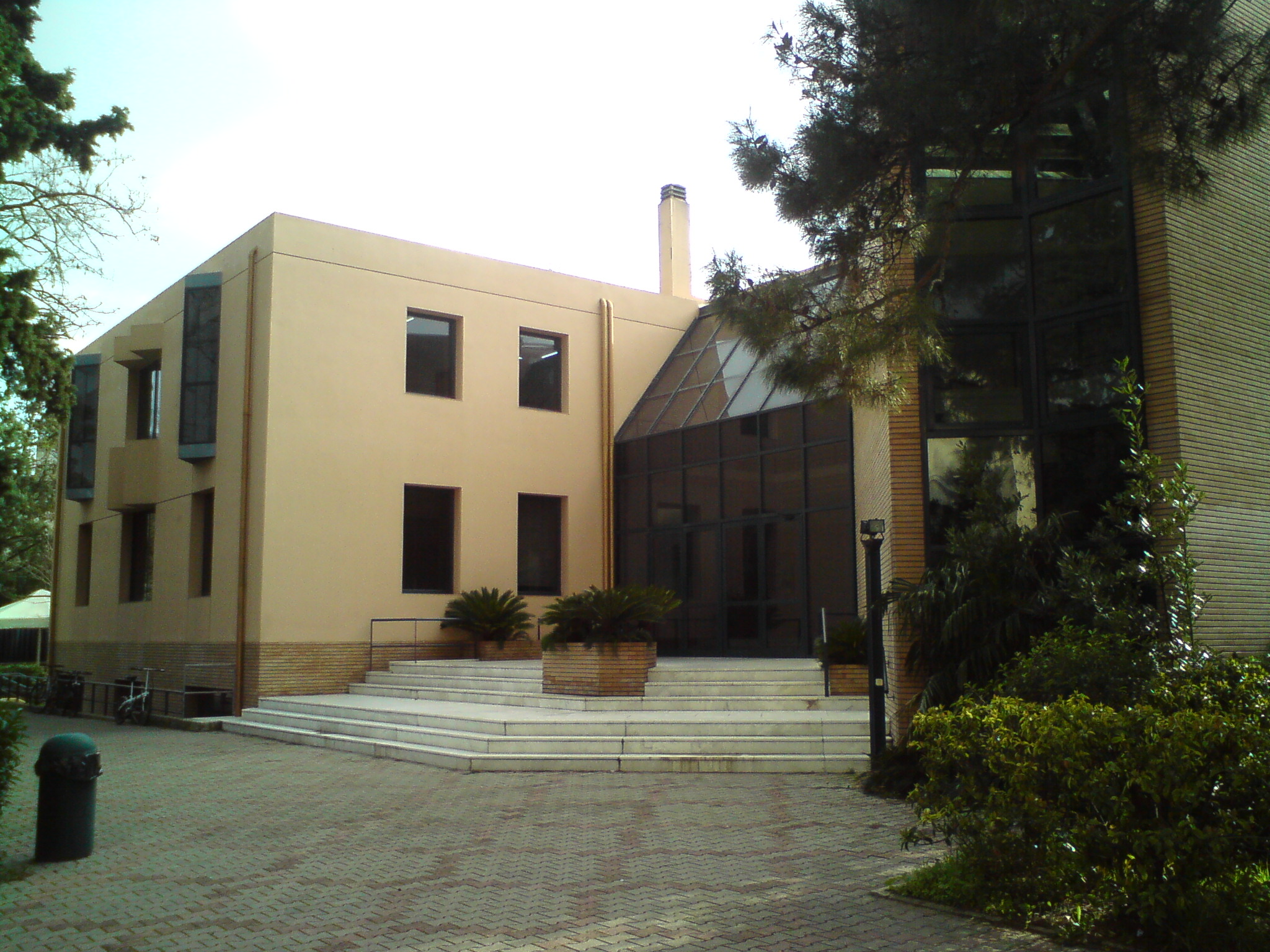
The New Building

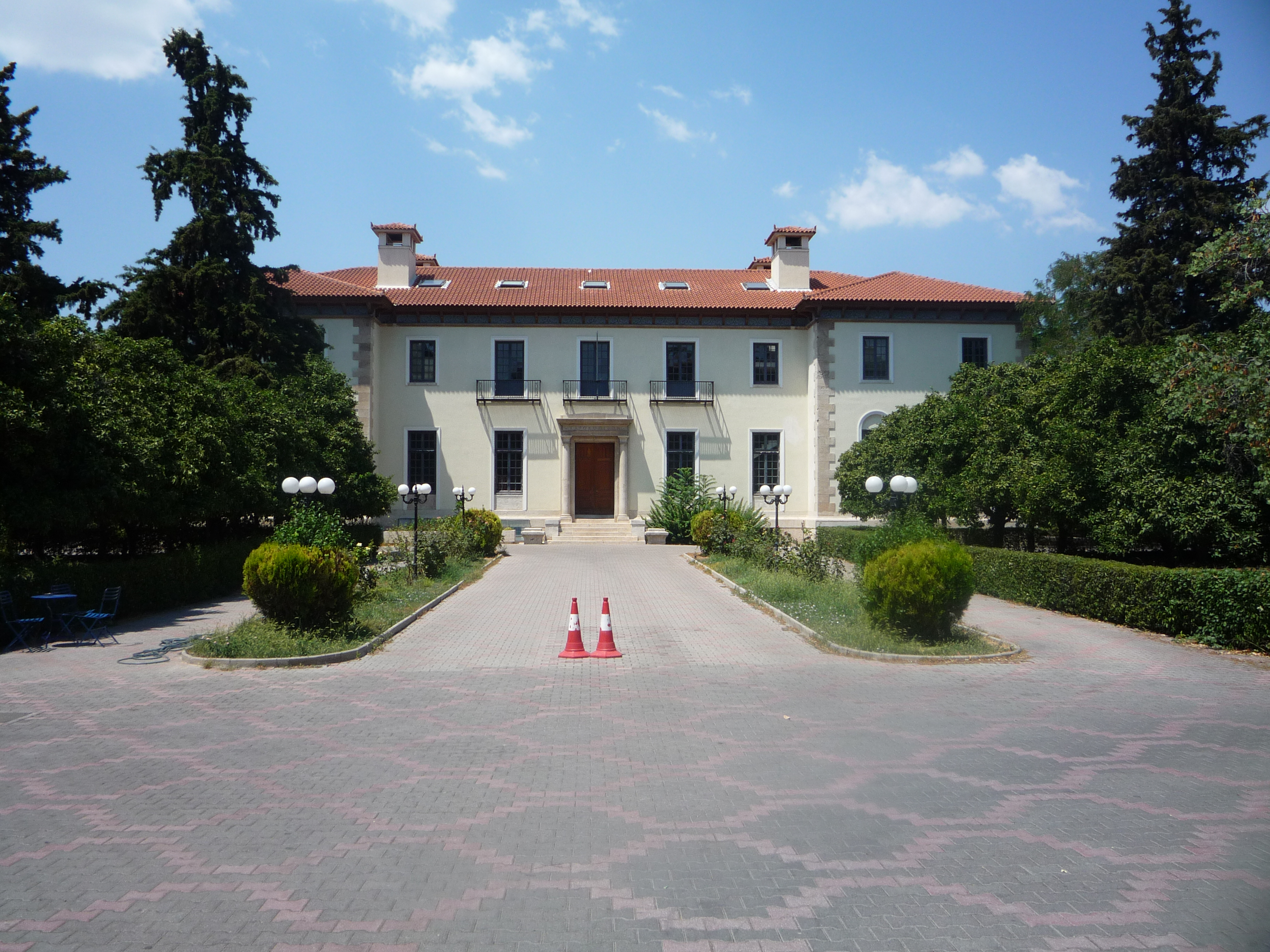
Harokopio University

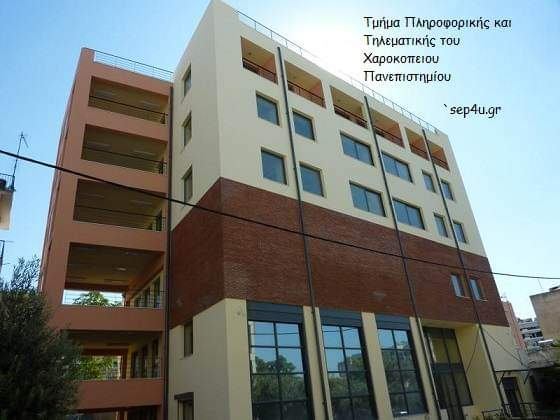
Harokopio University Informatics and Telematics Building

The infrastructure of the university is of high level, in fact it was fully restored in 1993-1994 while a new building was erected in 1999–2000 to house the newly established Geography Department and the library. In 2011 a new building was completed in the area of Tavros, for the newly established Department of Informatics and Telematics and the university's Refrectory.

== Research ==
Harokopio University is active in academic research and teaching in the wider fields of Home Economics and Ecology, Geography, Nutritional Sciences and Dietetics, as well as Informatics and Telematics, all including – to a larger or smaller extent – the study of the different aspects of the environment. Through research programmes, as well as its extensive ERASMUS educational exchange program, the university has built an extensive network of co-operation with other academic and research institutes and the private sector in Greece, Europe and worldwide.

According to statistics on publications as reported by the National Documentation Center, Harokopio University contributes to the scientific output of Greece.

== Academic departments ==
Today Harokopio University comprises 3 Schools and 4 academic Departments.

Schools	Departments
Environment, Geography and Applied Economics (founded 2013)	Economics and Sustainable Development (founded 1993)
Environment, Geography and Applied Economics (founded 2013)	Geography (founded 2000)
Health Science and Education (founded 2013)	Nutrition and Dietetics (founded 1994)
Digital Technology (founded 2013)	Informatics and Telematics (founded 2006)

== Academic evaluation ==
In 2016 the external evaluation committee gave Harokopio University a Positive evaluation.

An external evaluation of all academic departments in Greek universities was conducted by the Hellenic Quality Assurance and Accreditation Agency (HQA).

Harokopio is currently ranked 351–400th in The Times Higher Education (THE) world university rankings.

== Meteorological Station ==
Harokopio University maintains a World Meteorological Organization station in cooperation with the National Observatory of Athens. According to the station the University area has a hot semi-arid climate (BSh) bordering a hot-summer Mediterranean climate. During the summer of 2024 the station reached a stunning summer mean maximum temperature of 36.8 °C (98.2 °F).

Climate data for Harokopio University
Month	Jan	Feb	Mar	Apr	May	Jun	Jul	Aug	Sep	Oct	Nov	Dec	Year
Record high °C (°F)	22.8 (73.0)	21.9 (71.4)	26.1 (79.0)	31.6 (88.9)	36.9 (98.4)	41.4 (106.5)	43.4 (110.1)	43.3 (109.9)	37.3 (99.1)	32.1 (89.8)	28.0 (82.4)	22.1 (71.8)	43.4 (110.1)
Mean daily maximum °C (°F)	14.4 (57.9)	15.6 (60.1)	18.4 (65.1)	22.3 (72.1)	26.9 (80.4)	32.4 (90.3)	35.9 (96.6)	35.1 (95.2)	30.4 (86.7)	25.3 (77.5)	20.3 (68.5)	16.0 (60.8)	24.4 (75.9)
Daily mean °C (°F)	10.6 (51.1)	11.6 (52.9)	13.9 (57.0)	17.4 (63.3)	21.9 (71.4)	27.1 (80.8)	30.5 (86.9)	30.1 (86.2)	25.6 (78.1)	20.7 (69.3)	16.2 (61.2)	12.4 (54.3)	19.8 (67.7)
Mean daily minimum °C (°F)	6.7 (44.1)	7.6 (45.7)	9.5 (49.1)	12.5 (54.5)	16.8 (62.2)	21.8 (71.2)	25.1 (77.2)	25.0 (77.0)	20.8 (69.4)	16.1 (61.0)	12.2 (54.0)	8.8 (47.8)	15.2 (59.4)
Record low °C (°F)	−1.6 (29.1)	−0.4 (31.3)	−0.2 (31.6)	5.5 (41.9)	11.7 (53.1)	14.2 (57.6)	18.3 (64.9)	19.2 (66.6)	12.8 (55.0)	9.1 (48.4)	4.4 (39.9)	0.8 (33.4)	−1.6 (29.1)
Average rainfall mm (inches)	52.2 (2.06)	34.4 (1.35)	28.1 (1.11)	19.6 (0.77)	19.2 (0.76)	26.7 (1.05)	8.9 (0.35)	13.1 (0.52)	23.1 (0.91)	27.4 (1.08)	62.0 (2.44)	63.2 (2.49)	377.9 (14.89)
Source 1: National Observatory of Athens Monthly Bulletins (Nov 2016 - Aug 2025)
Source 2: Harokopio Athens N.O.A station and World Meteorological Organization

== See also ==
- Panteion University, founded in 1927, it is the oldest university of Social and Political Sciences in Greece.
- List of universities in Greece
- List of research institutes in Greece
- European Higher Education Area
- Outline of academic disciplines
- Education in Greece
