= Saronic Gulf =

Gulf in the Aegean sea between the peninsulas of Attica and Argolis

- Σαρωνικός κόλπος (Greek)
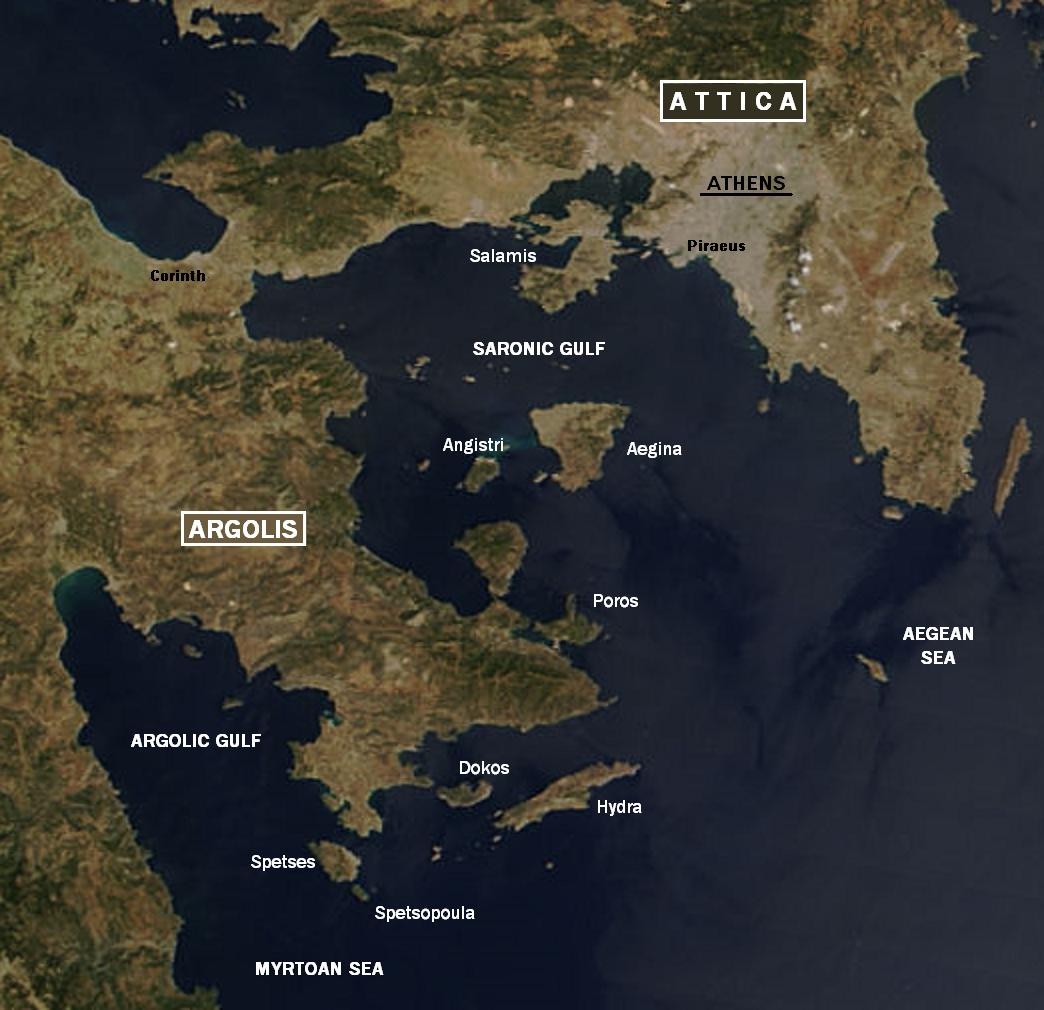
- The Saronic Gulf and its major islands

- Location of the Saronic Gulf within Greece
- Location: Attica and the Peloponnese
- Coordinates: 37.7°N 23.6°E
- Type: Gulf
- Part of: Aegean Sea
- Basin countries: Greece

The Saronic Gulf (Greek: Σαρωνικός κόλπος, Saronikós kólpos) or Gulf of Aegina in Greece is formed between the peninsulas of Attica and Argolis and forms part of the Aegean Sea. It defines the eastern side of the isthmus of Corinth, being the eastern terminus of the Corinth Canal, which cuts across the isthmus. The Saronic Islands in the gulf have played a pivotal role in the history of Greece, with the largest, Salamis being the location of a significant naval battle in the Greco-Persian wars. The Megara Gulf makes up the northern end of the Saronic Gulf.

The Athens urban area lies on the north coast of the Saronic Gulf.

== Etymology ==
The origin of the gulf's name comes from the mythological king Saron who drowned at the Psiphaea lake (modern Psifta). The Saronic Gulf was a string of six entrances to the Underworld, each guarded by a chthonic enemy in the shape of a thief or bandit.

== History ==
The Battle of Salamis, fought in 480 BCE in the Saronic Gulf near modern-day Piraeus, was a major naval engagement in which the Athenian-led Greek fleet defeated the much larger Persian forces of Xerxes I. The victory was a turning point in the Greco-Persian Wars and contributed significantly to Athens' rise as a dominant power in the classical Greek world.

The ancient port of Cenchreae used to be situated here.

== Geography ==
The gulf includes the islands of Aegina, Salamis, and Poros along with smaller islands of Patroklos and Fleves. The port of Piraeus, Athens' port, lies on the northeastern edge of the gulf. The site of the former Ellinikon International Airport is also in the northeast.

Beaches line much of the gulf coast from Poros to Epidaurus, Galataki to Kineta and from Megara to Eleusis and from Piraeus down to Anavyssos. Athens' urban area surrounds the northern and the eastern coasts of this gulf.

Bays in the gulf include Phaleron Bay, Elefsina Bay to the north, Kechries Bay in the northwest and Sofiko Bay in the east.

The volcano of Methana is located to the southwest along with Kromyonia at the Isthmus of Corinth, Aegina and Poros. Methana is also the youngest most active volcano center and forms the northwestern end of the cycladic arch of active volcanoes that includes Milos island, Santorini island and Nisyros island. A hydropathic institute at Methana makes use of the hot sulphurous water that still surfaces in the area. The most recent eruption was of a submarine volcano north of Methana in the 17th century.

The gulf has refineries around the northern part of the gulf including east of Corinth and west of Agioi Theodoroi, Eleusis, Aspropyrgos, Skaramangas and Keratsini. These refineries produce most of Greece's refined petroleum products, a large proportion of which are then exported. Commercial shipping to the refineries, Piraeus, and to and from the canal make the gulf quite a busy area with commercial shipping.

Fault lines dominate especially in the northwestern part.

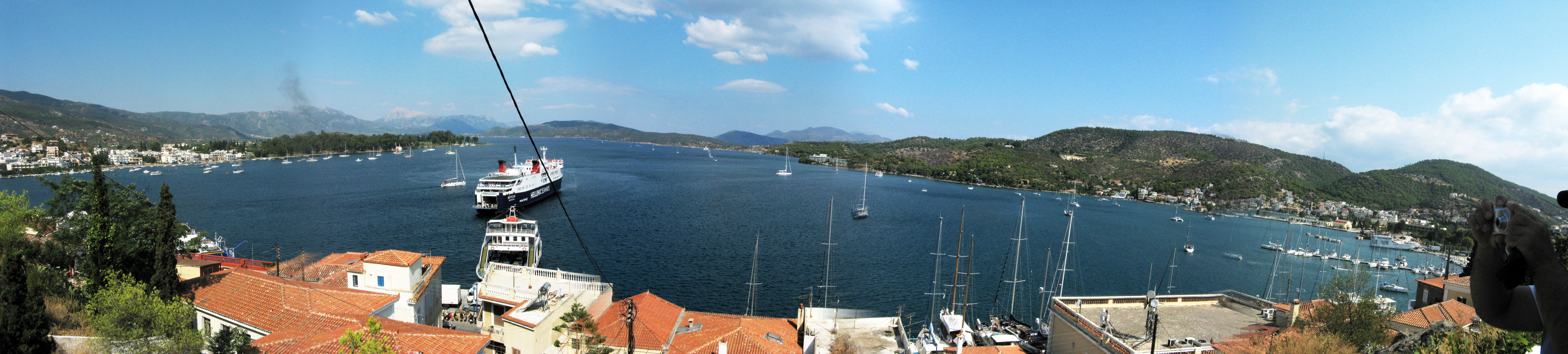
Panoramic view of Saronic Gulf from Poros island

== Tributaries ==
- Kechries Bay
- Saronic Bay Coast (basin)
  - Lower Galataki Basin
  - Upper Galataki Basin
  - Examilia Basin
  - Athikia Basin
- Loutro Basin
- Megara Bay/Megara Gulf
- Cephissus River (Eleusis)
- Cephissus (Athenian plain) between Piraeus and Phaliron.

== Capes ==
- Cape Lomvardi - SW of Vouliagmeni

== Sailing ==
Sailing is popular in the Saronic Gulf which, like the neighbouring Argolic Gulf, benefits from the Attic mainland's partial shelter from the summer Meltemi wind that can reach Force 7 and above further to the east in the Aegean islands.

The Gulf boasts two particularly notable archaeological sites: the ancient theatre at Epidaurus and nearby asclepieion and the Temple of Aphaia on Aegina.

== Other ==
The Saronic Gulf is one of congregating areas for short-beaked common dolphins in Aegean Sea. On recent occasions, more of large whales such as fin whales have been sighted in the gulf due to improving environmental conditions.

== See also ==
- Megara Gulf
