= List of former equipment of the Hellenic Armed Forces =

Hellenic navy seal

Hellenic army seal

Hellenic air force seal

List of former equipment of the Hellenic armed forces from 1821 until after 1945.

== Offensive weapons ==
=== Greek war of independence (1821–1829) and after (1830–1911) ===
Edged weapons

- Bayonet (made in different countries, to attach on rifles and muskets)
- Improvised knife (Greek made)
- Janbiya dagger (Arabian made)
- Khanjali dagger sword (Caucasian made, also known as Kinzhal)
- M1730 sword (Austrian made)
- Yatagan sabre (Turkish captured and Greek made)

Pistols and revolvers

- Agrafa flintlock pistol (Greek made)
- Chamelot-Delvigne M1873, M1874 and M1884 revolver (French made)
- Ktoros M1837 caplock pistol (Greek made)
- Mylonas Pistol M1877 (Greek made)
- Lefaucheux M1854 revolver (French made)
- Nagant M1895 revolver (Belgian made)

Rifles and muskets

- Berthier M1892 carbine (French made)
- Boyliya flintlock musket (Turkish captured)
- Brown Bess flintlock musket (British made)
- Carlo & figlio Lazarin M1790 flintlock musket (Italian origin and Greek made)
- Carlo & figlio M1800 and M1820 flintlock musket (Italian origin and Greek made)
- Charleville flintlock musket (French made)
- Chassepot Μ1866 rifle (French made)
- Comblain M1870 rifle (Belgian made)
- Gras M1874 rifle (French made)
- Ktoros M1837 caplock musket (Greek made)
- Lebel Model 1886 rifle (French made)
- Mannlicher M1895 rifle (Austrian made)
- Mylonas M1872 rifle (Belgian made and Greek origin)
- Nafplion M1833 caplock musket (French and Greek made)
- Rasak flintlock musket (Balkan origin and Greek made)
- Sishane M1812 flintlock musket (Turkish captured)
- Tufek flintlock musket (Turkish captured)
- Vasilopulos M1901 rifle (Greek made)

Grenades

- Improvised bombs and grenades (Greek made)

Special weapons

- Vasiliadis sea mine (Greek made)

Artillery

- Trieste mountain cannon (Italian made)

Other vehicles

- Horses (Origin from different countries and Greek bred)
- Horse-drawn carriages (made in various countries, including Greece)
- Steam powered carriages (made in different countries, to carry supplies)

Ships

- Afroessa Steamship (Scottish made)
- Aktion Ι steam gunboat (British made, also known as Spetses ΙΙ)
- Alexandros Brig (Russian captured)
- Amfitriti ΙΙΙ steam gunboat (British made)
- Amfitriti IV steamship (British made, also known as Malvina and Bubulina)
- Aris Barco (Italian made, also known as Iraklis)
- Aris Brig (Italian made, also known as Athina)
- Arkadion Steamship (British made)
- Emmanuil Ship of the line (Russian made)
- Enosis Steamship (British made)
- Epihirisis Paddle steamship (British made)
- Ermis Ι paddle steamship (British made)
- Hellas Ι frigate (American made, one of two ordered from American shipyard, also known as Elpis)
- Hydra Ι corvette (Greek made)
- Hydra ΙΙ steam gunboat (British made, renamed Amvrakia ΙΙ)
- Hydra-class ironclad battleships (French made)
  - Hydra
  - Psara
  - Spetses
- Kalavria Paddle steamship (British made)
- Karteria Paddle steamship (British made, it was the first steam powered warship to be used in combat)
- Kissa-class steamships (British made)
  - Aidon Ι
  - Kihli Ι
  - Kissa Ι
- Kriti Ι steamship (British made)
- Miaulis II cruiser (French made)
- Orfefs Brig (Russian made)
- Panellinion Steamship (British made)
- Panopi I steamship (Scottish made)
- Panopi ΙI steamship (Scottish made)
- Paralos Steamship (Scottish made)
- Patra Ι corvette (Russian made, also known as Ariadni)
- Persefs Brig (Russian made)
- Pliksavra Steamship (Scottish made)
- Poros Amalia Ι corvette (Greek made)
- Poros Athina Ι paddle steamship (Greek made, also known as Othon)
- Poros Messologion corvette (Greek made, also known as Ludovikos)
- Psara Ι corvette (Greek made, renamed Prigips Maximilianos)
- Psara ΙΙ steamship (Scottish made, renamed Kanaris ΙΙ)
- Psara Galiot (Greek made)
- Salaminia Ι steamship (Scottish made)
- Sfendoni Steamship (Scottish made, also known as Nafplion)
- Spetses Ι Agamemnon corvette (Greek made)
- Vasilefs Georgios Ironclad corvette (British made)
- Vasilissa Olga Ironclad corvette (Austrian made)

Submarines

- Gryparis Submarine (Greek made, possibly available to the Hellenic navy)
- Nordenfelt I Pireas (British origin, Swedish made and Greek assembly)
- Vuteas Submarine (Greek made, possibly available to the Hellenic navy)

=== Balkan wars (1912–1913) and World War I (1917–1918) ===
Edged weapons

- Bayonet (made in different countries, to attach on rifles)
- Improvised knife (Greek made)

Pistols and revolvers

- Bergmann-Bayard M1903 and M1908 (German made)
- Browning FN M1900 (American origin and Belgian made)
- Browning FN M1903 (American origin and Belgian made)
- Chamelot-Delvigne M1873, M1874 and M1884 (French made)
- Colt M1907 Army Special (American made)
- Mannlicher M1901 (Austrian made)
- Nagant M1895 (Belgian made)
- Ruby M1914 (French made)

Rifles

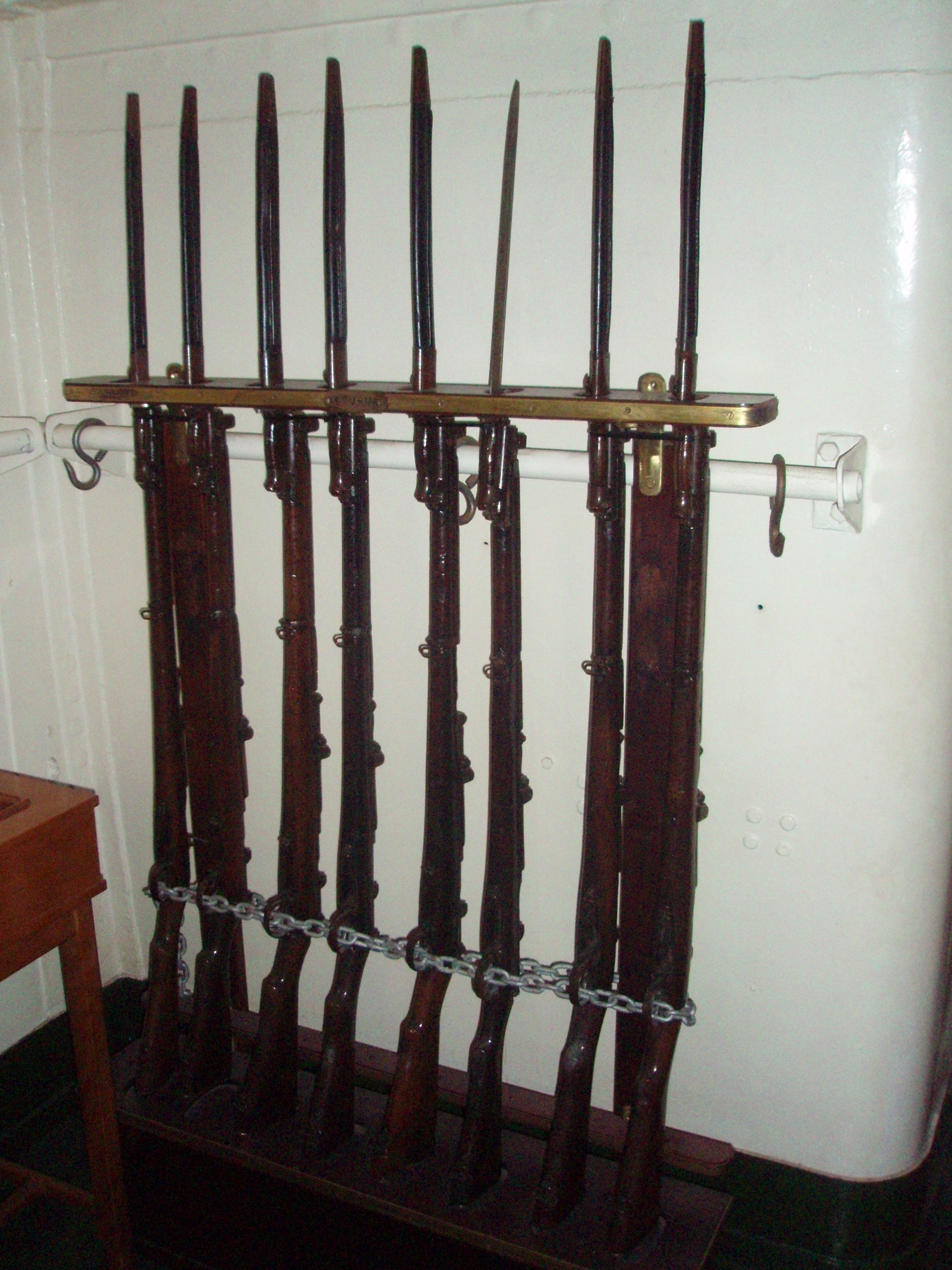
Mannlicher–Schönauer rifles on the Averof Cruiser

- Berthier M1892, M1892/16, M1907/15 and M1916 (French made)
- Gras M1874 and M1874/14 (French made)
- Lebel M1886/93 (French made)
- Mannlicher M1895 (Austrian made)
- Mannlicher-Schönauer M1903 and M1903/14 (Austrian made)

Light machine guns

- Chauchat M1915 (French made)

Medium machine guns

- Colt-Browning M1895/14 (American made)
- Hotchkiss M1914 (American origin and French made)
- Saint Étienne M1907/16 (French made)

Heavy machine guns

- Schwarzlose M1907/12 (Austrian made)

Grenades

- F1 M1915, M1916 and M1917 (French made)
- Improvised bombs and grenades (Greek made)

Mortars

- Aasen 88.9mm M1915 (French made)
- Stokes mortar (British made)

Artillery

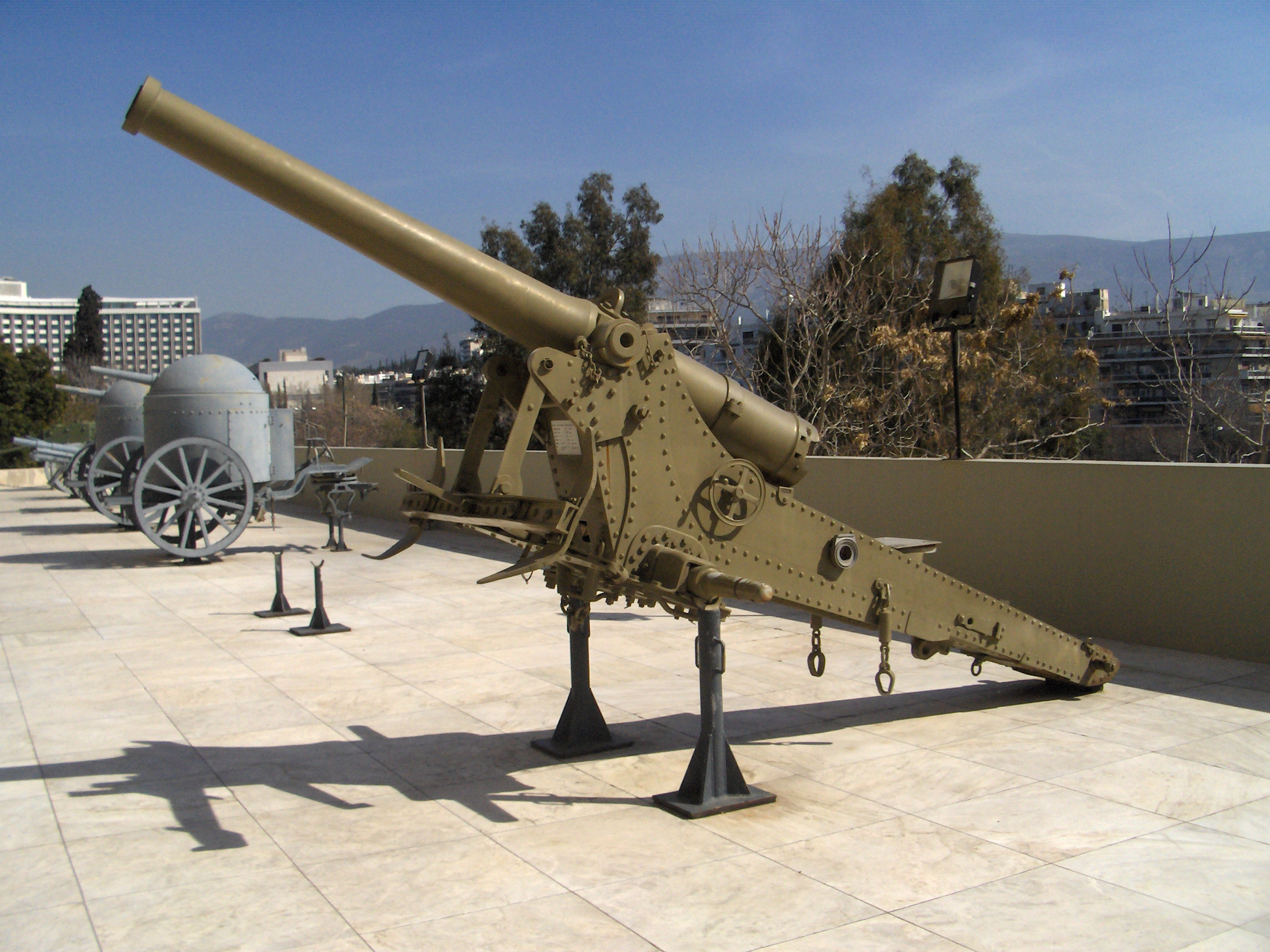
De Bange 120mm L M1878 siege cannon at the war museum of Athens in Greece

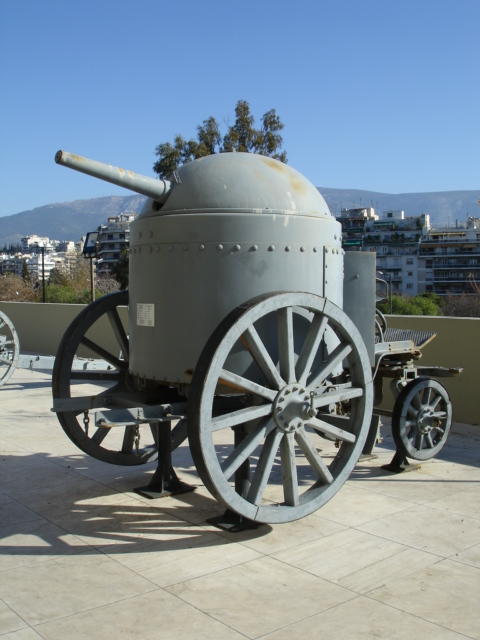
Gruson 5.3cm L/24 M1890 fahrpanzer (cannon turret) at the war museum of Athens in Greece

- 75mm M1897 field cannon (French made)
- De Bange 120mm L M1878 siege cannon (French made)
- Gruson 5.3cm L/24 M1890 fahrpanzer (Bulgarian captured and German origin cannon turret)
- Krupp 7.5cm L/14 M1904 feldkanone (Turkish captured and German origin field cannon)
- Krupp 7.5cm L/30 M1904 gebirgskanone (Turkish captured and German origin mountain cannon)
- Krupp 10.5cm L/35 M1880 festungkanone (German made fortress cannon)
- Krupp 15cm L/25 M1880 festungkanone (German made fortress cannon)
- Krupp-Lykudis 7.5cm gebirgskanone (German made and Greek origin mountain cannon)
- Ordnance BL 6-inch 30 cwt howitzer (British made)
- Schneider 155mm C M1917 field howitzer (French made)
- Schneider-Canet 75mm M1910 mountain cannon (French made)
- Schneider-Creusot 75mm M1906 field cannon (French made)
- Schneider-Danglis 75mm M1906/09 mountain cannon (French made and Greek origin)
- Schneider-Ducrest 65mm M1906 mountain cannon (French made)
- Skoda 105mm M1916 mountain cannon (Czechoslovak made)

Other vehicles

- Horses (Origin from different countries and Greek bred)
- Horse-drawn carriages (made in various countries, including Greece)
- Knox-Martin Gun carrier (American made)
- Motorcycles (made in different countries)
- Trucks (made in different countries, to carry supplies)

Ships

- Aktion Ι steam gunboat (British made, also known as Spetses ΙΙ)
- Amfitriti IV steamship (British made, also known as Malvina and Bubulina)
- Amfitriti V steamship (French made)
- Antalya Torpedo boat (Turkish captured, renamed Nikopolis)
- Averof Cruiser (Italian made)
- Belomorets Tugboat (Bulgarian captured)
- Egli-class torpedo boats (German made)
  - Alkioni Ι
  - Arethusa
  - Dafni ΙΙ
  - Doris Ι
  - Egli Ι
  - Thetis ΙΙ
- Elli Cruiser (American made, the name derived from the ancient Greek Ellispondos of Dardanelles)
- Hydra ΙΙ steam gunboat (British made, renamed Amvrakia ΙΙ)
- Hydra-class ironclad battleships (French made)
  - Hydra
  - Psara
  - Spetses
- Kilkis battleship (American made)
- Kissa-class steamships (British made)
  - Aidon Ι
  - Kihli Ι
  - Kissa Ι
- Limnos battleship (American made)
- Niki-class destroyers (German made)
  - Aspis Ι
  - Doxa Ι
  - Niki Ι
  - Velos Ι
- Psara ΙΙ steamship (Scottish made, renamed Kanaris ΙΙ)
- Thiria-class destroyers (British made)
  - D-01 Aetos Ι
  - D-36 Ierax ΙΙ
  - D-50 Leon II
  - D-72 Panthir I
- Thyella-class destroyers (British made)
  - Lonhi
  - Nafkratusa
  - Sfendoni
  - Thyella
- Tokat Torpedo boat (Turkish captured, renamed Tatoi)
- V-class destroyers (German made)
  - Keravnos
  - Nea Genea

Submarines

- Schneider Delfin Ι (French made)
- Schneider Xifias Ι (French made)

Aircraft

- Airco DH.4 (British made)
- Airco DH.6 (British made)
- Airco DH.9 (British made)
- Astra Hydroplane (Spanish origin and French made, it had the nickname Naftilos)
- Avro 504K (British origin and Greek made)
- Blériot XI-2 (Turkish captured and French origin)
- Breguet 14A2 and B2 (French made)
- Bristol 2 Scout C (British made)
- Caudron G.3 (French made)
- Dorand AR.1 and AR.2 (French made)
- Fairey Hamble Hydroplane (British made)
- Farman HF.III (French made, Greek assembly and modification, it had the nicknames Gypas, Ierax, Aetos and Daedalos)
- Farman HF.XX (French made)
- Farman HF.XXII (French made)
- Farman HF.XXVII (French made)
- Farman MF.VII (French made)
- Farman MF.VII bis hydravion (French made)
- Nieuport 4G (French made, it had the nickname Alkion)
- Nieuport 24 and 24bis (French and Greek made)
- Nieuport 27 (French made)
- Pelterie R.E.P. Ν (Turkish captured and French origin)
- Royal Aircraft Factory B.E.2C and E (British made)
- Short 184 hydroplane (British made)
- Sopwith 1.5 Strutter (British made)
- Sopwith Bat flying boat (British made)
- Sopwith Camel (British made)
- Sopwith Pup (British made)
- Sopwith Pusher hydroplane (British made)
- SPAD S.VII (French and Greek made)
- SPAD S.XIII (French made)

=== Russian Civil War (1919) and Greco-Turkish War (1919–1922) ===
Edged weapons

- Bayonet (made in different countries, to attach on rifles)
- Improvised knife (Greek made)

Pistols and revolvers

- Bergmann-Bayard M1903 and M1908 (German made)
- Nagant M1895 (Belgian made)
- Ruby M1914 (French made)

Rifles

- Berthier M1892, M1892/16, M1907/15 and M1916 (French made)
- Gras M1874 and M1874/14 (French made)
- Lebel M1886/93 (French made)
- Mannlicher M1895 (Austrian made)
- Mannlicher-Schönauer M1903 and M1903/14 (Austrian made)

Light machine guns

- Chauchat M1915 (French made)

Medium machine guns

- Hotchkiss M1914 (American origin and French made)
- Saint Étienne M1907/16 (French made)

Heavy machine guns

- Schwarzlose M1907/12 (Austrian made)

Grenades

- F1 M1915, M1916 and M1917 (French made)
- Improvised bombs and grenades (Greek made)

Artillery

- 75mm M1897 field cannon (French made)
- De Bange 120mm L M1878 siege cannon (French made)
- Ordnance BL 6-inch 30 cwt howitzer (British made)
- Schneider 155mm C M1917 field howitzer (French made)
- Schneider-Canet 75mm M1910 mountain cannon (French made)
- Schneider-Creusot 75mm M1906 field cannon (French made)
- Schneider-Danglis 75mm M1906/09 mountain cannon (French made and Greek origin)
- Schneider-Ducrest 65mm M1906 mountain cannon (French made)
- Skoda 105mm M1916 mountain cannon (Czechoslovak made)

Other vehicles

- Horses (Origin from different countries and Greek bred)
- Horse-drawn carriages (made in various countries, including Greece)
- Latil TAR (French made gun carrier)
- Motorcycles (made in different countries)
- Trucks (made in various countries, to carry supplies)

Ships

- Aktion ΙΙ minelayer (German made)
- Averof Cruiser (Italian made)
- Egli-class torpedo boats (German made)
  - Alkioni Ι
  - Arethusa
  - Dafni ΙΙ
  - Doris Ι
  - Egli Ι
  - Thetis ΙΙ
- Elli Cruiser (American made, the name derived from the ancient Greek Ellispondos of Dardanelles)
- Keravnos Destroyer (German made)
- Kilkis battleship (American made)
- Kydonia-class torpedo boats (Austrian made)
  - Kios
  - Kydonia
  - Kyzikos
  - Panormos
  - Pergamos
  - Prusa
- Limnos battleship (American made)
- Niki-class destroyers (German made)
  - Aspis Ι
  - Niki Ι
  - Velos Ι
- Thiria-class destroyers (British made)
  - D-01 Aetos Ι
  - D-36 Ierax ΙΙ
  - D-50 Leon II
  - D-72 Panthir I
- Thyella-class destroyers (British made)
  - Lonhi
  - Nafkratusa
  - Sfendoni
  - Thyella
- Vasilissa Sofia Ι steamship (German made)

Aircraft

- Airco D.H.4 (British made)
- Airco D.H.9 (British made)
- Ansaldo A.1 (Italian captured)
- Avro 504K (British origin and Greek made)
- Breguet 14A2 and B2 (French made)
- Caudron G.3 (French made)
- Dorand AR.1 and AR.2 (French made)
- Fairey Hamble Hydroplane (British made)
- Nieuport 24 and 24bis (French made)
- Nieuport 27 (French made)
- Royal Aircraft Factory B.E.2C and E (British made)
- Sopwith 1.5 Strutter (British made)
- Sopwith Camel (British made)
- SPAD S.VII (French made)
- SPAD S.XIII (French made)

=== Interwar (1923–1939) and World War II (1940–1945) ===
Edged weapons

- Bayonet (made in different countries, to attach on rifles)
- Improvised knife (Greek made)

Pistols and revolvers

- Beretta M1934 (Italian captured)
- Beretta M1935 (Italian captured)
- Bergmann-Bayard M1908 (German made)
- Browning FN M1910/22 (American origin and Belgian made)
- Colt M1927 Official Police (American made)
- Luger pistol (German captured)
- Nagant M1895 (Belgian made)
- Ruby M1914 (French made)

Submachine guns

- Beretta M1938 (Italian captured)
- M3 submachine gun (American made, also known as grease gun, used by mountain commandos and exiled Greek forces)
- MP 34 (German captured, used by gendarmerie and police forces)
- MP 40 (German captured)
- Sten submachine gun (British made, used by exiled Greek forces)
- Thompson M1928 and M1A1 (American made, used by exiled Greek forces)
- Makrykano M1943 (Greek made, used by exiled Greek forces)

Rifles

- Berthier M1892, M1892/16, M1907/15 and M1916 (French made)
- Carcano rifle (Italian captured)
- Gras M1874 and M1874/14 (French made)
- Lebel M1886/93 (French made)
- Lee-Enfield rifle (British made, used by exiled Greek forces)
- Mannlicher M1895 (Austrian made)
- Mannlicher-Schönauer M1903, M1903/14, M1903/27 and M1903/30 (Austrian made)
- Mauser FN M1930 (Belgian made and German origin)
- Rigopulos M1941 (Austrian origin and Greek modification)
- Philippidis M1925 (Austrian origin and Greek modification)
- Lelakis M1923 (Austrian origin and Greek modification)

Light machine guns

- Breda M1930 (Italian captured)
- Bren machine gun (British made, used by exiled Greek forces)
- Chauchat M1915 (French made)
- EPK M1939 (Greek made)
- Hotchkiss Μ1922/26 (American origin and French made)

Medium machine guns

- Hotchkiss M1914 (American origin and French made)
- EYP Hotchkiss (French made and Greek modification)
- St. Étienne M1907/16 (French made)

Heavy machine guns

- Schwarzlose M1907/12 (Austrian made)

Grenades

- F1 grenade (French made)
- Churnat grenade (Greek made)
- Improvised bombs and grenades (Greek made)

Mortars

- Brandt M1927/31 (French made)
- Brixia M1935 (Italian captured)

Special weapons

- Skuras & Romanos depth charge (Greek made)
- Stylianos & Konstadaras depth charge (Greek made)
- Stylianos & Konstadaras sea mine (Greek made)
- STYLKON Argonaftis sea mine (Greek made)
- STYLKON depth charge (Greek made)
- STYLKON M sea mine (Greek made)

Anti-tank weapons

- PIAT (British made)
- Boys anti-tank rifle (British made)

Anti-aircraft weapons

- Bofors 80mm M1929 AA gun (Swedish made)
- Hotchkiss 25mm M1939 AA gun (American origin and French made)
- Rheinmetall 2cm M1937 flugzeugabwehrkanone (German captured AA gun)
- Rheinmetall 3.7cm M1937 flugzeugabwehrkanone (German captured AA gun)

Artillery

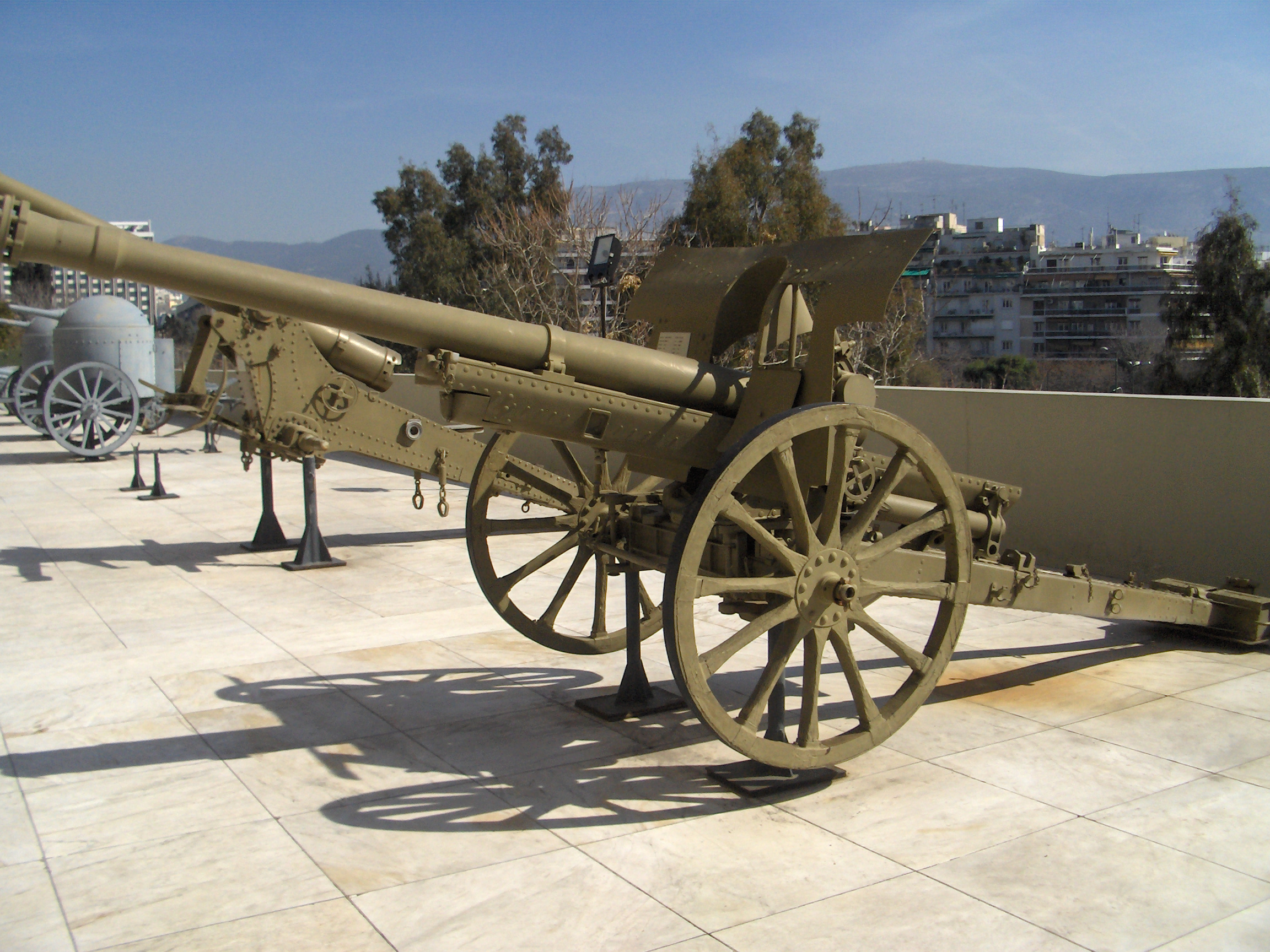
Schneider 85mm M1927 field cannon at the war museum of Athens in Greece

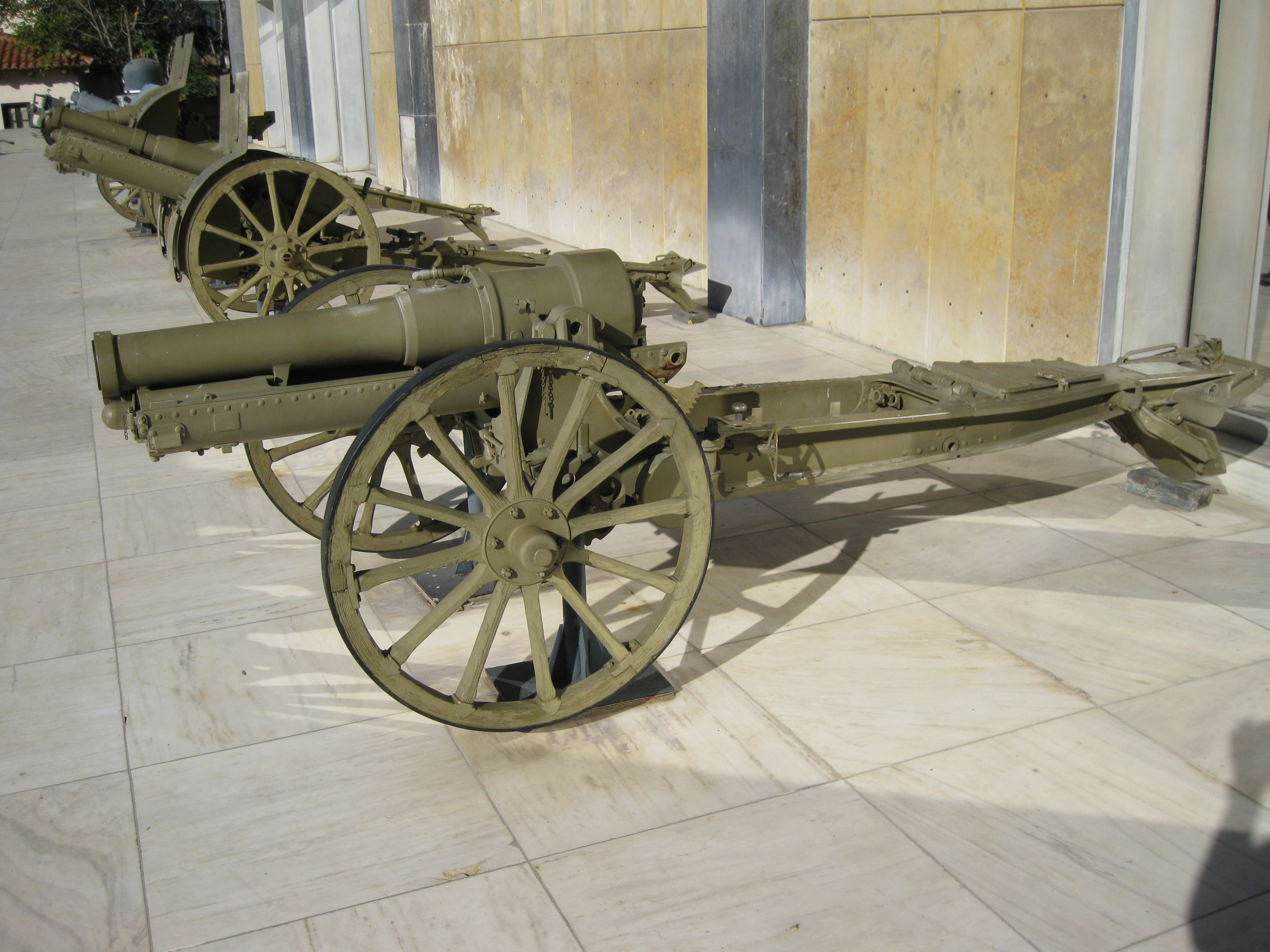
Schneider 105mm M1919/24 mountain cannon at the war museum of Athens in Greece

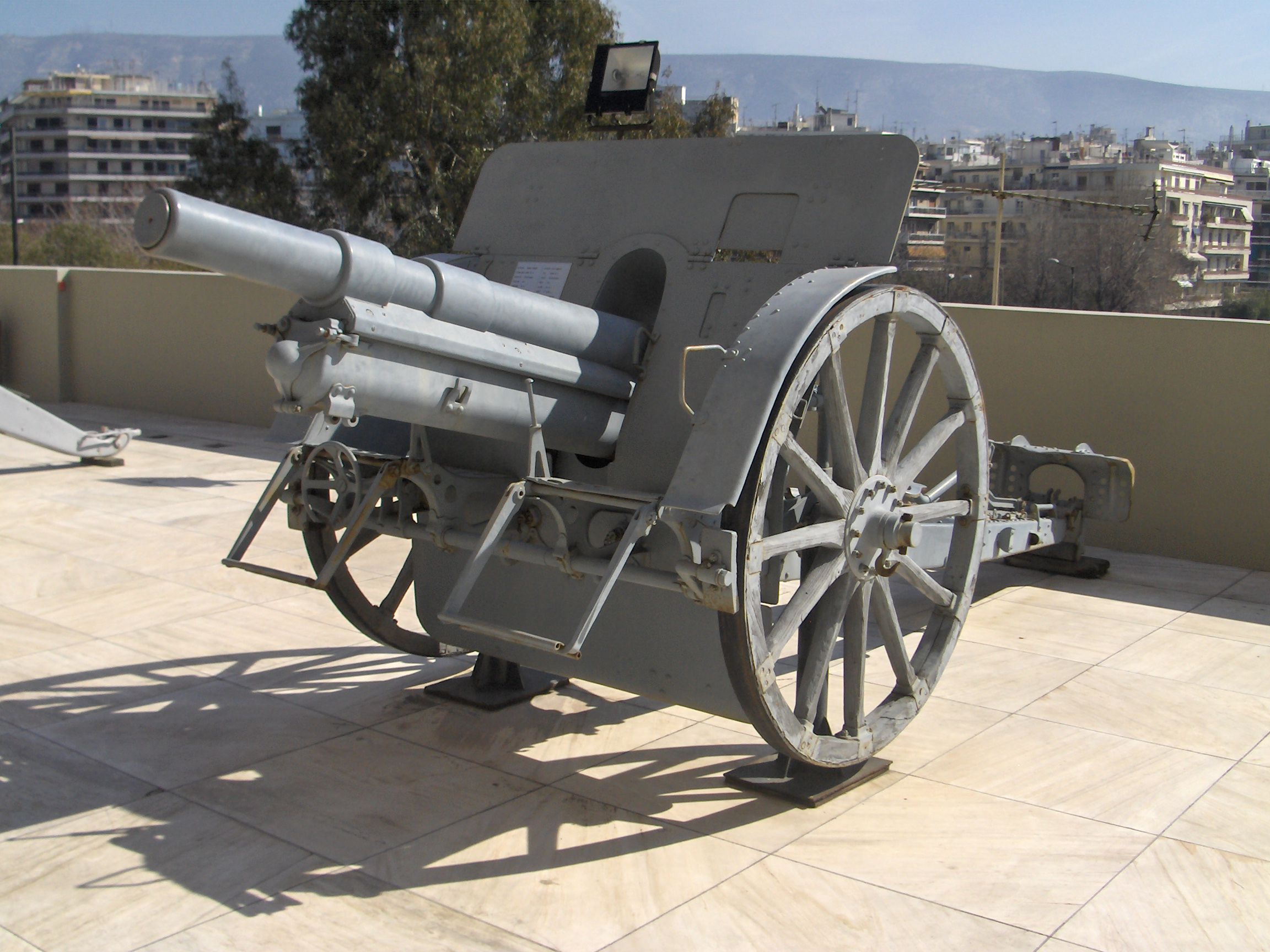
Skoda 100mm M1914/19 field howitzer at the war museum of Athens in Greece

- 75mm M1897 field cannon (French made)
- 75mm M1917 field cannon (American made and British origin)
- De Bange 120mm L M1878 siege cannon (French made)
- Ordnance BL 6-inch 30 cwt howitzer (British made)
- Schneider 75mm M1919 mountain cannon (French made)
- Schneider 85mm M1927 field cannon (French made)
- Schneider 105mm M1919/24 mountain cannon (French made)
- Schneider 105mm M1925/27 field cannon (French made)
- Schneider 155mm C M1917 field howitzer (French made)
- Schneider-Canet 75mm M1910 mountain cannon (French made)
- Schneider-Creusot 75mm M1906 field cannon (French made)
- Schneider-Danglis 75mm M1906/09 mountain cannon (French made and Greek origin)
- Schneider-Ducrest 65mm M1906 mountain cannon (French made)
- Skoda 100mm M1914/19 field howitzer (Czechoslovak made)
- Skoda 105mm M1916 mountain cannon (Czechoslovak made)

Other vehicles

- AEC Matador (British made gun carrier)
- Demag Sonderkraftfahrzeug Sd.Kfz.10/1 (German captured halftrack gun carrier)
- Hanomag WD-50 (German made gun carrier)
- Horses (Origin from different countries and Greek bred)
- Horse-drawn carriages (made in various countries, including Greece)
- M3A1 scout car (American made armoured personnel carrier)
- Morris C8 (British made gun carrier)
- Motorcycles (made in different countries)
- Pavesi P4/100 (Italian made gun carrier)
- SOMUA MCG5 (French origin and Greek modification halftrack gun carrier)
- Trucks (made in different countries, to carry supplies)
- Universal Carrier (British made supply carrier)
- Vickers Light Dragon Mk IIC (British made gun carrier)
- Willys MB (American made personnel carrier, also known as Jeep)

Self-propelled artillery

- Ford F30 2-pounder self-propelled AT gun (American made anti-tank truck)

Armoured cars and trucks

- ACV-IP Mk II (British and Indian made armoured carrier)
- Daimler Dingo Mk II (British made light armoured car)
- Fiat-Ansaldo AB41 (Italian captured armoured car)
- Ford Lynx Mk II (Canadian made light armoured car)
- General Motors C15TA (Canadian made armoured truck)
- General Motors Otter (Canadian made light armoured truck)
- Humber LRC (British made light armoured car)
- Marmon-Herrington Mk I, Mk III and Mk IV F (South African made armoured car)
- Peerless Vickers Armoured truck (American, British origin and Greek modification)

Tanks

- Fiat-Ansaldo L3/35 (Italian captured tankette)
- Fiat M13/40 (Italian captured medium tank)
- Vickers 6-ton Mk EA and Mk EB (British made light tank)
- Vickers-Carden-Loyd M1936 (British made light tank)
- Vickers-Carden-Loyd Mk VI (British made tankette)

Ships

- Amfitriti IV steamship (British made, also known as Malvina and Bubulina)
- Aris Training steamship (French made)
- Averof Cruiser (Italian made)
- D14 Vasilefs Georgios destroyer (British made)
- D15 Vasilissa Olga destroyer (British made)
- Egli-class torpedo boats (German made)
  - Alkioni Ι
  - Arethusa
  - Doris Ι
  - Egli Ι
- Elli Cruiser (American made, the name derived from the ancient Greek Ellispondos of Dardanelles)
- Flower-class corvettes (British made)
  - Apostolis ΙΙ
  - Kriezis ΙΙ
  - Sahturis ΙΙ
  - Tombazis ΙΙ
- Freccia-class destroyers (Italian made)
  - D96 Psara
  - D97 Hydra
  - D98 Spetses
  - D99 Kunturiotis
- Harbour defence motor launch boat ML1051 (British made)
- Harbour defence motor launch boat ML1149 (British made)
- Harbour defence motor launch boat ML1221 (British made)
- Hunt-class destroyers (British made)
  - L51 Themistoklis
  - L53 Kanaris
  - L65 Pindos
  - L67 Adrias (The name derived from the ancient Greek Adriatic)
  - L84 Kriti
  - L91 Miaulis
- Kihli Ι steamship (British made)
- Kilkis battleship (American made)
- Kydonia-class torpedo boats (Austrian made)
  - Kios
  - Kydonia
  - Kyzikos
  - Pergamos
  - Prusa
- L158 Limnos tank landing ship (American made)
- L179 Samos tank landing ship (American made)
- L195 Hios tank landing ship (American made)
- Lavrion A5 patrol boat (Italian and Greek made)
- Limnos battleship (American made)
- M209 Afroessa minesweeper (British made)
- M210 Leros minesweeper (British made)
- M212 Kos minesweeper (British made)
- Niki-class destroyers (German made)
  - Aspis Ι
  - Niki Ι
- Paralos Minesweeper (American made)
- Salamis K1 tugboat (Greek made)
- T1 and T2 Torpedo boat (British made)
- Thiria-class destroyers (British made)
  - D-01 Aetos Ι
  - D-36 Ierax ΙΙ
  - D-50 Leon II
  - D-72 Panthir I
- Thyella-class destroyers (British made)
  - Sfendoni
  - Thyella

Submarines

- Katsonis-class submarines (French made)
  - Y1 Katsonis ΙΙ
  - Y2 Papanikolis Ι
- Protefs-class submarines (French made)
  - Y3 Protefs Ι
  - Υ4 Nirefs Ι
  - Υ5 Triton Ι
  - Y6 Glafkos ΙΙ
- Υ7 Matrozos (Italian captured)
- Υ8 Pipinos (British made)

Aircraft

- Arado Ar 196A-3 and A-5 (German captured)
- Armstrong Whitworth Atlas Mk I (British origin and Greek made)
- Avia B-534-II (Czechoslovak made)
- Avia BH-33SHS (Czechoslovak made)
- Avro 504K, N and O (British origin and Greek made)
- Avro 621 Tutor (British origin and Greek made)
- Avro 626 Prefect (British made)
- Avro 652 Anson Mk I and Mk II (British made)
- Blackburn T.3 and T.3A Velos (British origin and Greek made)
- Bloch MB.151C1 (French made)
- Breguet 19A2 and B2 (French made)
- Bristol 81A and 86 Tourer (British made)
- Bristol Blenheim Mk I, Mk IV and Mk V (British made)
- De Havilland D.H.60 Gipsy Moth (British made)
- Dornier Do 22KG (German made)
- Fairey IΙIΒ, IIIF Mk I and IIIM (British made)
- Fairey Battle Mk I (British made)
- Fieseler Fi 156C-1 (German captured)
- Gloster Gladiator Mk I and Mk II (British made)
- Gloster Mars Mk VI (British made, also known as Nieuport Nighthawk)
- Hanriot HD.14 (French made)
- Hanriot HD.17 (French made)
- Hanriot H.41 (French made)
- Hawker Horsley Mk II (British made)
- Hawker Hurricane Mk I, Mk IIB and Mk IIC (British made)
- Henschel Hs 126K-6 (German made)
- Junkers G 24 (German made)
- Junkers Ju 52-3M (German captured)
- Junkers Ju 290A-5 (German captured)
- KEA Chelidon (Greek made)
- KEA Xelona (Greek made)
- Martin 187 A-30A Baltimore Mk III, Mk IIIA, Mk IV and Mk V (American made)
- Messerschmitt Bf 109G-6 (German captured)
- Morane-Saulnier MS.35 (French made, also known as Morane-Saulnier AR)
- Morane-Saulnier MS.137 (French made)
- Morane-Saulnier MS.147 (French made)
- Morane-Saulnier MS.230 (French made)
- Potez 25A2 (French made)
- Potez 633B2 (French made)
- Raab-AEKKEA R-1C Schwalbe II (German origin and Greek made, possibly available to the Hellenic air force)
- Raab-AEKKEA R-26V, R-33 Tigerschwalbe (Greek made, possibly available to the Hellenic air force)
- Raab-AEKKEA R-27 (German origin and Greek made, possibly available to the Hellenic air force)
- Raab-AEKKEA R-29 (Greek made, possibly available to the Hellenic air force)
- Stearman-Boeing-Kaydet 75 PT-13 and PT-17 (American made)
- PZL P-24F and G (Polish made)
- Savoia-Marchetti SM.79-I (Italian captured)
- Supermarine Spitfire Mk VB, Mk VC, Mk IX and Mk XVI (British made)
- Taylorcraft Auster Mk III (British made)

=== Post-World War II (1946 and after) ===
Note that this equipment is mainly retired.

Edged weapons

- Bayonet (made in different countries, to attach on rifles)
- Improvised knife (Greek made)

Pistols and revolvers

- EVO M1985 semiautomatic pistol (German origin and Greek made)

Submachine guns

- HROPI GP10 submachine gun (Greek made)
- M3 submachine gun (American made, also known as grease gun)
- Sten submachine gun (British made)
- Thompson submachine gun (American made)

Automatic rifles

- HROPI automatic rifle (Greek made)
- FN FAL (Belgian origin and Greek modification)
- Heckler & Koch G3 (German origin and Greek made)

Rifles

- Lee-Enfield rifle (British made)
- M1 Garand (American made)
- Springfield M1903 (American made)

Scoped rifles

- EVO M1995 Kifefs (Greek made)

Light machine guns

- Bren machine gun (British made)
- Browning M1918 (American made)

Medium machine guns

- Browning M1919 (American made)

Heavy machine guns

- Browning M2 (American made)

Grenades

- Elviemek EM-01 grenade (Greek made)
- Elviemek EM-14 rifle grenade (Greek made)
- Improvised bombs and grenades (Greek made)

Mortars

- EVO E44 81mm mortar (Greek made)
- EVO E56 120mm mortar (Greek made)
- M1 81mm mortar (American made and French origin)

Anti-tank weapons

- EVO M1984 Aris IV AT rocket launcher (Greek made)

Anti-aircraft weapons

- EPTAE M1990 Aris AA missile launcher (Greek made)
- EVO 30mm M1982 Artemis AA gun (Greek made)

Drones

- EADS 3 Sigma Nearchos (Greek made)
- EAV (HAI) Ε1-79 Pegasos I (Greek made)

Other vehicles

- AEC Matador (British made gun carrier)
- BTR-60PU and PU-12M (Russian made armoured personnel carrier)
- ELVO Leonidas Ι (Austrian origin and Greek made armoured personnel carrier)
- ELVO Leonidas ΙΙ (Austrian origin and Greek made armoured personnel carrier)
- M3 half-track (American made armoured personnel carrier)
- M3A1 scout car (American made armoured personnel carrier)
- M4 tractor (American made gun carrier)
- M5 tractor (American made gun carrier)
- M32A1B3, M32Β1, M32Β3 and M32Β4 (American made recovery tank)
- M59 (American made armoured personnel carrier)
- M74 (American made recovery tank)
- M578 (American made recovery tank)
- Morris C8 (British made gun carrier)
- Motorcycles (made in various countries)
- MOWAG Grenadier amphibisch schutzenpanzer (Swiss made amphibious armoured personnel carrier, used by gendarmerie)
- MOWAG Roland schutzenpanzer (Swiss made armoured personnel carrier, used by police forces)
- MT-LB (Russian made amphibious armoured personnel carrier)
- NDI MRAP (American made armoured personnel carrier)
- Trucks (made in different countries, to carry supplies)
- Universal carrier (British made supply carrier)
- Willys MB (American made personnel carrier, also known as Jeep)
- Willys MC (American made personnel carrier, also known as M38 Jeep)
- Willys MD (American made personnel carrier, also known as M38A1 Jeep)

Armoured cars and trucks

- General Motors C15TA (Canadian made armoured truck)
- General Motors Otter (Canadian made light armoured truck)
- Humber Armoured car Mk IV (British made)
- Humber LRC (British made light armoured car)
- Humber scout car Mk I and Mk II (British made light armoured car)
- M8 Greyhound (American made light armoured car)
- Marmon-Herrington Mk I, Mk III and Mk IV F (South African made armoured car)
- T17E1 Staghound (American made armoured car)

Self-propelled artillery

- M42 Duster (American made anti-aircraft tank)

Tanks

- A-27L Centaur Mk I and Mk VIII (British made medium tank)
- AMX-10P (French made infantry fighting tank)
- AMX-30 (French made medium tank)
- ELVO Kentavros (Greek made infantry fighting tank)
- Fiat-Ansaldo L3/35 (Italian captured tankette)
- M3A3 Stuart Recce (American made light tank)
- M18 Hellcat (American made tank destroyer)
- M24 Chaffee (American made light tank)
- M47 Patton (American made battle tank)
- M48A3 Patton (American made battle tank)
- M60 (American made battle tank)
- T-34-85 (Russian made medium tank)
- Vickers-Armstrongs Mk VI (British made light tank)

Ships

- A324 Ermis minesweeper tender (British made)
- A373 Ermis electronic surveillance ship (German made)
- A384 Sotir salvage ship (British made)
- Α407 Adeos tugboat (American made)
- Α408 Atlas tugboat (Canadian made)
- Α409 Ahillefs II tugboat (German made)
- Α412 Eas II tugboat (American made)
- A413 Pilefs tugboat (German made)
- A415 Evros fleet support ship (French made)
- Α421 Thisefs tugboat (American made)
- Α428 Atlas tugboat (British made)
- Α429 Persefs II tugboat (Canadian made)
- Α429 Persefs III tugboat (American made)
- Α432 Gigas tugboat (American made)
- Α436 Minos tugboat (German made)
- Α437 Pelias tugboat (German made)
- A438 Egefs II tugboat (German made)
- Α439 Atrefs tugboat (German made)
- Aheloos Tank landing ship (British made)
- Alfios Tank landing ship (British made)
- Aliakmon Tank landing ship (British made)
- Anafi Tank landing craft (British made)
- Axios Tank landing ship (British made)
- Blohm & Voss Α440 Diomidis tugboat (German made)
- Blohm & Voss MEKO 200 HN frigate (German origin and Greek made)
- Castagno-class minehunters (Italian made)
  - M60 Erato
  - Μ61 Evniki
- Combattante III-class fast attack boats (French made)
  - P20 Laskos
  - P21 Blessas
  - P22 Mykonios
  - P23 Trupakis
- D03 Egeon destroyer tender (German made)
- D218 Kimon destroyer (American made)
- D219 Nearhos destroyer (American made)
- D220 Formion destroyer (American made)
- D221 Themistoklis destroyer (American made)
- Elefsis Iason tank landing ship (Greek made)
- Elefsis Russen fast attack boat (British and Greek made)
- Elli Cruiser (Italian made, the name derived from the ancient Greek Ellispondos of Dardanelles)
- EN 56 Pyrpolitis gunboat (Greek made)
- EN 56A Mahitis gunboat (Greek made)
- EN Α410 Atromitos tugboat (Greek made)
- EN Α411 Adamastos tugboat (Greek made)
- EN P25 Kostakos fast attack boat (French origin and Greek made)
- EN P70 Panagopulos II fast patrol boat (Greek made)
- EN P96 Panagopulos III fast patrol boat (Greek made)
- Esperos-class fast attack boats (German made)
  - Typ 141 Albatros
  - Typ 141 Bussard
  - Typ 141 Esperos
  - Typ 141 Habicht
  - Typ 141 Kategis
  - Typ 141 Kormoran
  - Typ 141 Kyklon
  - Typ 141 Lelaps
  - Typ 141 Sperber
  - Typ 141 Typhon
- EVO Ultra fast strike catamaran (Greek made)
- F463 Bubulina frigate (Dutch made)
- Fletcher-class destroyers (American made)
  - D06 Aspis
  - D16 Velos
  - D28 Thyella
  - D56 Lonhi
  - D63 Navarinon
  - D85 Sfendoni
- Flower-class corvettes (British made)
  - Apostolis ΙΙ
  - Kriezis ΙΙ
  - Lykudis Ι (Also known as Hania)
  - Sahturis ΙΙ
  - Tombazis ΙΙ
- Gearing-class destroyers FRAM I (American made)
  - D212 Kanaris
  - D213 Kunturiotis
  - D214 Sahturis
  - D215 Tombazis
  - D216 Apostolis
  - D217 Kriezis
- Gearing-class destroyers FRAM II (American made)
  - D210 Themistoklis
  - D211 Miaulis
- Gleaves-class destroyers (American made)
  - D20 Doxa
  - D63 Niki
- Harbour defence motor launch boat ML1051 (British made)
- Harbour defence motor launch boat ML1149 (British made)
- Harbour defence motor launch boat ML1221 (British made)
- Hunt-class destroyers (British made)
  - L51 Themistoklis
  - L53 Kanaris
  - L65 Pindos
  - L69 Adrias (The name derived from the ancient Greek Adriatic)
  - L81 Hastings
  - L84 Kriti
  - L91 Miaulis
  - L95 Egeon
- Kandanos Tank landing craft (British made)
- Knox-class frigates (American made)
  - F456 Ipiros
  - F457 Thraki
  - F458 Makedonia
- Kommeno Tank landing craft (British made)
- Kythira Tank landing craft (British made)
- L104 Inusses tank landing ship (American made)
- L116 Kos tank landing ship (American made)
- L144 Syros tank landing ship (American made)
- L153 Nafkratusa dock landing ship (American made)
- L153 Nafkratusa dock landing ship (British made)
- L154 Ikaria tank landing ship (American made)
- L157 Rodos tank landing ship (American made)
- L158 Limnos tank landing ship (American made)
- L161 Grigoropulos medium landing ship (American made)
- L162 Turnas medium landing ship (American made)
- L163 Daniolos medium landing ship (American made)
- L164 Russen medium landing ship (American made)
- L165 Krystallidis medium landing ship (American made)
- L166 Merlin medium landing ship (American made)
- L171 Kriti tank landing ship (American made)
- L172 Lesvos tank landing ship (American made)
- L179 Samos tank landing ship (American made)
- L195 Hios tank landing ship (American made)
- M209 Afroessa minesweeper (British made)
- M210 Leros minesweeper (British made)
- Μ210 Thalia minesweeper (American made)
- M211 Symi minesweeper (British made)
- M212 Kos minesweeper (British made)
- M213 Argo minesweeper (American made)
- M242 Kissa minesweeper (American made)
- M246 Egli training ship (American made)
- Μ247 Dafni minesweeper (American made)
- Malakasi Tank landing craft (British made)
- Milos Tank landing craft (British made)
- Motomarine D45 patrol boat (Greek made)
- Motomarine Guardian 53 patrol boat (Greek made)
- Motomarine Javelin 74 fast patrol boat (Greek made)
- Motomarine Panther 57 patrol boat (Greek made)
- Motomarine Protector 29 fast patrol boat (Greek made)
- Ν04 Aktion minelayer (American made)
- Ν05 Amvrakia minelayer (American made)
- Neorion P289 Gulandris I patrol boat (Greek made)
- Neorion P290 Gulandris II patrol boat (Greek made)
- Olympic Marine OL44 patrol boat (Greek made)
- Olympic Marine L65-74 patrol boat (Greek made)
- Paleohori Tank landing craft (British made)
- Perama Α422 Odyssefs tugboat (Greek made)
- Perama A423 Iraklis ΙV tugboat (Greek made)
- Perama Α424 Iason I tugboat (Greek made)
- Pinios Tank landing ship (British made)
- Salamis A74 Aris training ship (Greek made)
- Serifos Tank landing craft (British made)
- Sofades Tank landing craft (British made)
- Strymon Tank landing ship (British made)
- Thetis-class gunboats (German made)
  - P62 Niki
  - P63 Doxa
  - P64 Eleftheria
  - P65 Karteria
  - P66 Agon
- Thira Tank landing craft (British made)
- Tiger-class fast attack boats (French origin and German made)
  - Typ 148 P14 Anninos
  - Typ 148 P15 Arliotis
  - Typ 148 P16 Konidis
  - Typ 148 P17 Batsis
  - Typ 148 P74 Vlahavas
  - Typ 148 P76 Turnas
  - Typ 148 P77 Sakipis
- Vrahni Tank landing craft (British made)
- Wild Beast-class destroyers (American made)
  - D01 Aetos
  - D31 Ierax
  - D54 Leon
  - D67 Panthir

Submarines

- Balao-class submarines (American made)
  - S86 Triena
  - S114 Papanikolis ΙΙ
- Gato-class submarines (American made)
  - S17 Amfitriti VII
  - S78 Posidon III
- Glafkos-class submarines (German made)
  - HDW Typ 209/1100 S110 Glafkos ΙΙΙ
  - HDW Typ 209/1100 S111 Nirefs ΙΙ
  - HDW Typ 209/1100 S112 Triton ΙΙ
  - HDW Typ 209/1100 S113 Protefs ΙΙ
  - HDW Typ 209/1200 S116 Posidon IV
  - HDW Typ 209/1200 S117 Amfitriti IX
  - HDW Typ 209/1200 S118 Okeanos
  - HDW Typ 209/1200 S119 Pontos
- S115 Katsonis III (American made)
- U-class submarines (British made)
  - Υ10 Xifias ΙΙ
  - Υ11 Amfitriti VI
- V-class submarines (British made)
  - Υ8 Pipinos
  - Υ9 Delfin ΙΙ
  - Υ14 Triena Ι
  - Υ15 Argonaftis
- Υ7 Matrozos (Italian captured)

Aircraft

- Aero Commander 680F and 680FL (American made)
- Arado Ar 196A-3 and A-5 (German captured)
- Avro 652 Anson Mk I and Mk II (British made)
- Beechcraft C-45F Expeditor (American made)
- Bell 47G-3, G-5, J-2, OH-13H and S Sioux (American made)
- Cessna T-37B and C Tweet (American made)
- Cessna T-41D Mescalero (American made)
- Convair F-102Α and ΤF-102Α Delta Dagger (American made)
- Curtiss SB2C-5 Helldiver (American made)
- Dassault Mirage F1CG (French made)
- De Havilland Canada DHC-2 Beaver (Canadian made)
- De Havilland D.H.82A Tiger Moth II (British made)
- Douglas C-47A, B and D Skytrain (American made, the British nicknamed it Dakota from a name of some Indian tribes such as the Lakota and Nakota)
- Fieseler Fi 156C-1 (German captured)
- Grumman G-159 Gulfstream I (American made)
- Grumman HU-16 Albatross (American made)
- Junkers Ju 290A-5 (German captured)
- Lockheed F-104G, RF-104G and TF-104G Starfighter (American made)
- Lockheed T-33A Silver Star (American made)
- LTV A-7E, H, TA-7C and H Corsair II (American made)
- Messerschmitt Bf 109G-6 (German captured)
- Nord 2501D Noratlas (French made)
- North American AT-6A, D and G Texan (American made)
- North American F-86D and E Sabre (American made)
- North American-Ryan L-17B Navion (American made)
- Northrop F-5Α, Β, NF-5A, B and RF-5Α Freedom Fighter (American made)
- Piper L-18B, C and L-21B Super Cub (American made)
- Republic F-84F Thunderstreak (American made)
- Republic F-84G Thunderjet (American made)
- Republic RF-84F Thunderflash (American made)
- Sikorsky UH-19B and D Chickasaw (American made)
- Stinson L-5, L-5B and C Sentinel (American made)
- Supermarine Spitfire Mk VB, Mk VC, Mk IX and Mk XVI (British made)
- Taylorcraft Auster Mk III (British made)
- Vickers 406 Wellington Mk XIIΙ and Mk XIV (British made)

== Defensive weapons ==
- Brodie helmet (British made)
- M1 helmet (American made)
- M1915 Adrian helmet (French made)
- M1934/39 helmet (Italian origin and Greek modification)
- M1938 helmet (Greek made)

== Gallery with Greek modifications and constructions ==
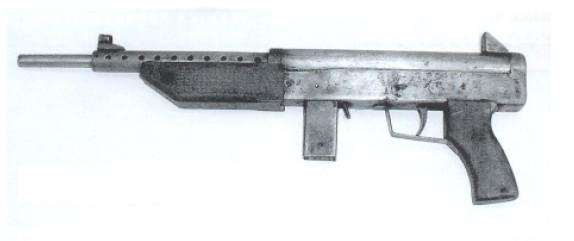
HROPI GP10 submachine gun

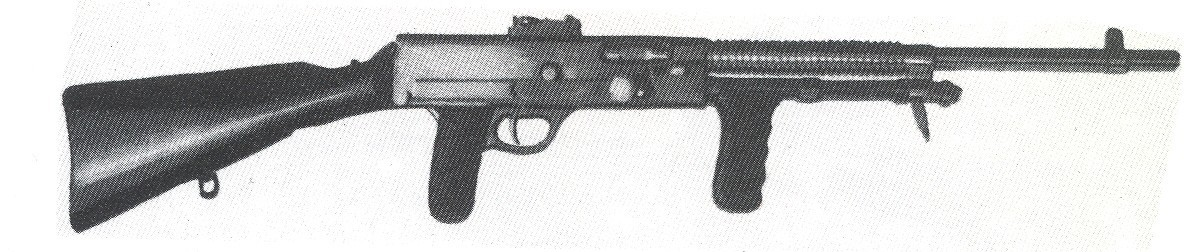
EPK M1939 machine gun

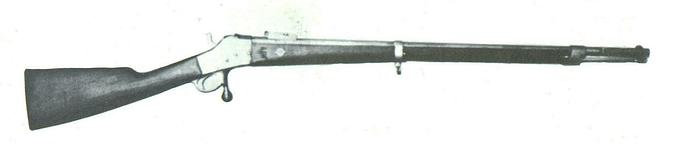
Mylonas M1872 rifle

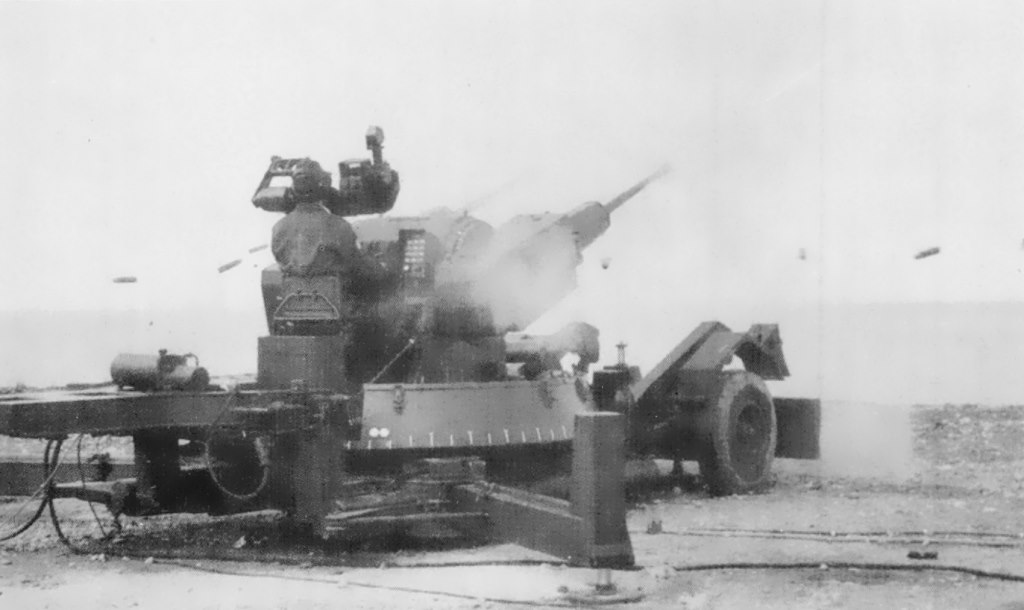
EVO 30mm M1982 Artemis AA gun

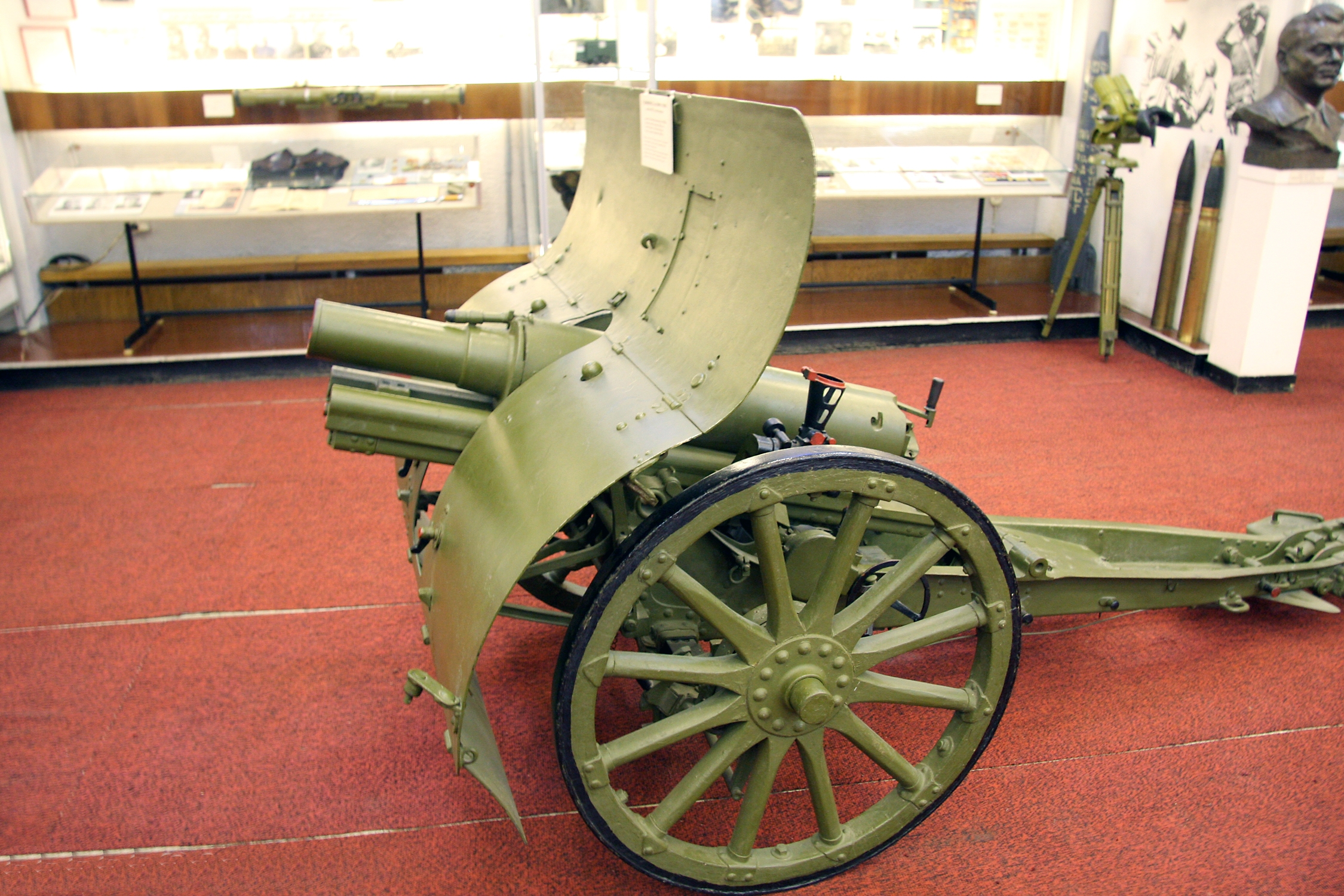
Schneider-Danglis 75mm M1906/09 mountain cannon

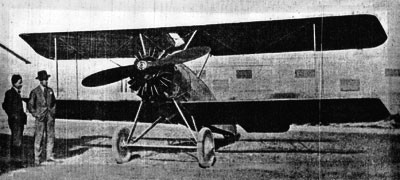
KEA Chelidon

== See also ==
- List of active Hellenic Navy ships
- List of decommissioned ships of the Hellenic Navy
- List of equipment of the Hellenic Army
- List of aircraft of the Hellenic Air Force
- List of historic aircraft of the Hellenic Air Force

== Bibliography ==
- C. Paizis-Paradellis (2002). Hellenic warships 1829–2001 (3rd ed.). Athens, Greece: The society for the study of Greek history. ISBN 960-8172-14-4.
- Skartsis, Labros (2013). Greek vehicle and machine manufacturers 1800 to present. Greece: Marathon. ISBN 978-960-93-4452-4.
- Skartsis, Labros (2026). Modern Greece's Machines: A Comprehensive Guide to Greek Vehicle & Machine Manufacturers (1700 to Present). Greece: Open Access e-book. ISBN 978-618-00-6734-7.
