= Royal Hellenic Navy in 1917 =

Ships of the Royal Hellenic Navy in 1917

The Hellenic Navy in 1917
| Battleships | Cruisers | Destroyers | Submarines | Coastal Defense |
|---|---|---|---|---|
| Kilkis | Georgios Averof | Aspis | Delfin | Hydra |
| Lemnos | Elli | Doxa | Xifias | Psara |
| | Navarchos Miaoulis | Niki | | Spetsai |
| | | Velos |
| | | Lonchi |
| | | Nafkratousa |
| | | Sfendoni |
| | | Thyella |
| | | Aetos |
| | | Ierax |
| | | Leon |
| | | Panthir |
| | | Keravnos |
| | | Nea Genea |

== See also ==
- History of the Hellenic Navy
- List of naval ships of Greece

== Bibliography ==
- Mach, Andrzej V. (1985). "Greece". In Gray, Randal (ed.). Conway's All the World's Fighting Ships 1906–1921. Annapolis, Maryland: Naval Institute Press. pp. 382–387. ISBN 0-85177-245-5.
