= Aspis (disambiguation) =

An aspis was the heavy wooden shield used by the infantry in various periods of ancient Greece.

Aspis may also refer to:

== Snakes ==
- Asp (reptile), any of several venomous snake species, known as "aspis" in antiquity
  - Vipera aspis, a species of venomous viper
  - Aspis cerastes, a synonym for Cerastes cerastes, a venomous viper
  - Aspis vipera, a synonym for Cerastes vipera, a venomous viper

== Ships ==
- Greek ship Aspis, the name of two destroyers of the Hellenic Navy
- SS Aspis, a Greek cargo ship in service 1960–63

== Places ==
- Aspis Island, Antarctica
- Aspis (Punic), a Carthaginian town at present-day Kelibia, Tunisia
  - Siege of Aspis, 255 BC

== Other uses ==
- The Aspis another name for the ancient Hesiodic poem the Shield of Heracles
- Aspis (Menander), a comedy by Menander
- Aspis (Dungeons & Dragons), a creature in Dungeons & Dragons
- Laura Aspis Prize (or Aspis Prize or Aspis Award), a former award in the game of chess
- T Bank, formerly Aspis Bank, a former commercial bank in Greece

== See also ==
- Apsis, point of least or greatest distance of a body in an elliptic orbit
- Athos-Aspis, a commune in the Pyrénées-Atlantiques department, France
