= Greek ship Aspis =

At least three ships of the Hellenic Navy have borne the name Aspis (Greek: Ασπίς, "Shield"):

- Greek torpedo boat Aspis (1877), built in 1877 by Yarrow & Company at Poplar, London.
- Greek destroyer Aspis (1906), a Niki-class destroyer launched in 1906 and stricken in 1945.
- Greek destroyer Aspis (D06), a Fletcher-class destroyer launched in 1942 as USS Conner she was transferred to Greece in 1959 and renamed. She was scrapped in 1997.

== See also ==
- SS Aspis, a Greek cargo ship in service 1960–1963, formerly known as SS Empire Baffin, built in 1941.
