= Velos =

Velos (Greek: Βέλος) is a Greek word meaning "arrow". It can refer to:

- Greek destroyer Velos - two destroyers that served in the Royal Hellenic Navy.
- Blackburn Velos, a 1920s seaplane co-produced by Greece and Britain
