= Greek ship Velos =

At least two ships of the Hellenic Navy have borne the name Velos (Greek: Βέλος, "Arrow"):

- Greek destroyer Velos (1907) a Niki-class destroyer launched in 1907 and stricken in 1926.
- Greek destroyer Velos (D16) a Fletcher-class destroyer launched in 1942 as USS Charrette she was transferred to Greece in 1959 and renamed. She was stricken in 1991 and became a museum ship.
