= EADS 3 Sigma =

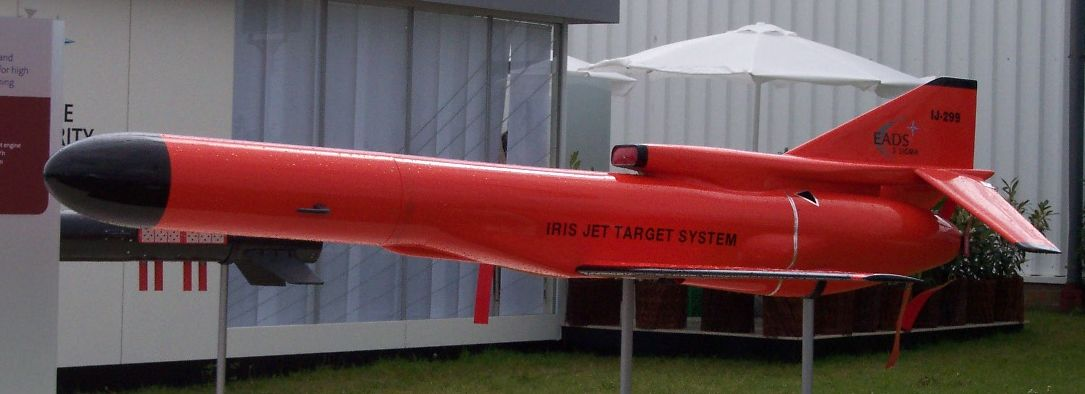
EADS 3 Sigma Irisjet

EADS 3 Sigma is the name since 2002 (when its majority was acquired by the European EADS Group) of the Greek 3 Sigma aerospace company. It was founded in 1987 with headquarters in Athens and production facilities in Chania, Crete. It has designed, produced and exported a variety of Unmanned Aerial Vehicles - including the Iris, Alkyon, Perseas (also available with single- and twin-jet engines), and 3 Sigma Nearchos types - as well as various electronics; its areas of research and development, in collaboration with Greek Universities, have included engine and remote control technologies.

EADS 3 Sigma announced in November 2012 that the company was in liquidation as it was no longer financially viable to continue its operations. A successor company, ALTUS LSA, was subsequently founded by former 3 Sigma executives.

== External links/References ==
- L.S. Skartsis, "Modern Greece's Machines: A Comprehensive Guide to Greek Vehicle & Machine Manufacturers (1700 to Present)" (2026) ISBN 978-618-00-6734-7 (eBook)
- https://web.archive.org/web/20091212070405/http://www.eads-3sigma.gr/
- Article about ALTUS LSA, successor company (in Greek)
