= AG Vulcan Stettin =

German shipbuilding and locomotive building company

- Industry: Shipbuilding and Locomotive building
- Founded: 1851
- Defunct: 1945
- Fate: Dismantled after World War II
- Headquarters: Stettin, Prussia (now Szczecin, Poland)
- Number of employees: ~20,000 (in 1918)
- Parent: Deutsche Schiff- und Maschinenbau

Aktien-Gesellschaft Vulcan Stettin (short AG Vulcan Stettin) was a German shipbuilding and locomotive building company. Founded in 1851, it was located near the city of Stettin, today Polish Szczecin. Because of the limited facilities in Stettin, in 1907 an additional yard was built in Hamburg. The now named Vulcan-Werke Hamburg und Stettin Actiengesellschaft constructed some of the most famous civilian German ships and it played a significant role in both World Wars, building warships for the Kaiserliche Marine and the Kriegsmarine later.

Both yards became members of the Deschimag in the 1920s. The Stettin shipyard was closed in 1928, opened again in 1939. During World War II it exploited slave workers, and after the war, was taken over by the Polish government, while the Hamburg yard was sold to Howaldtswerke AG in 1930 and the Locomotive Department was sold to Borsig in Berlin.

== History ==
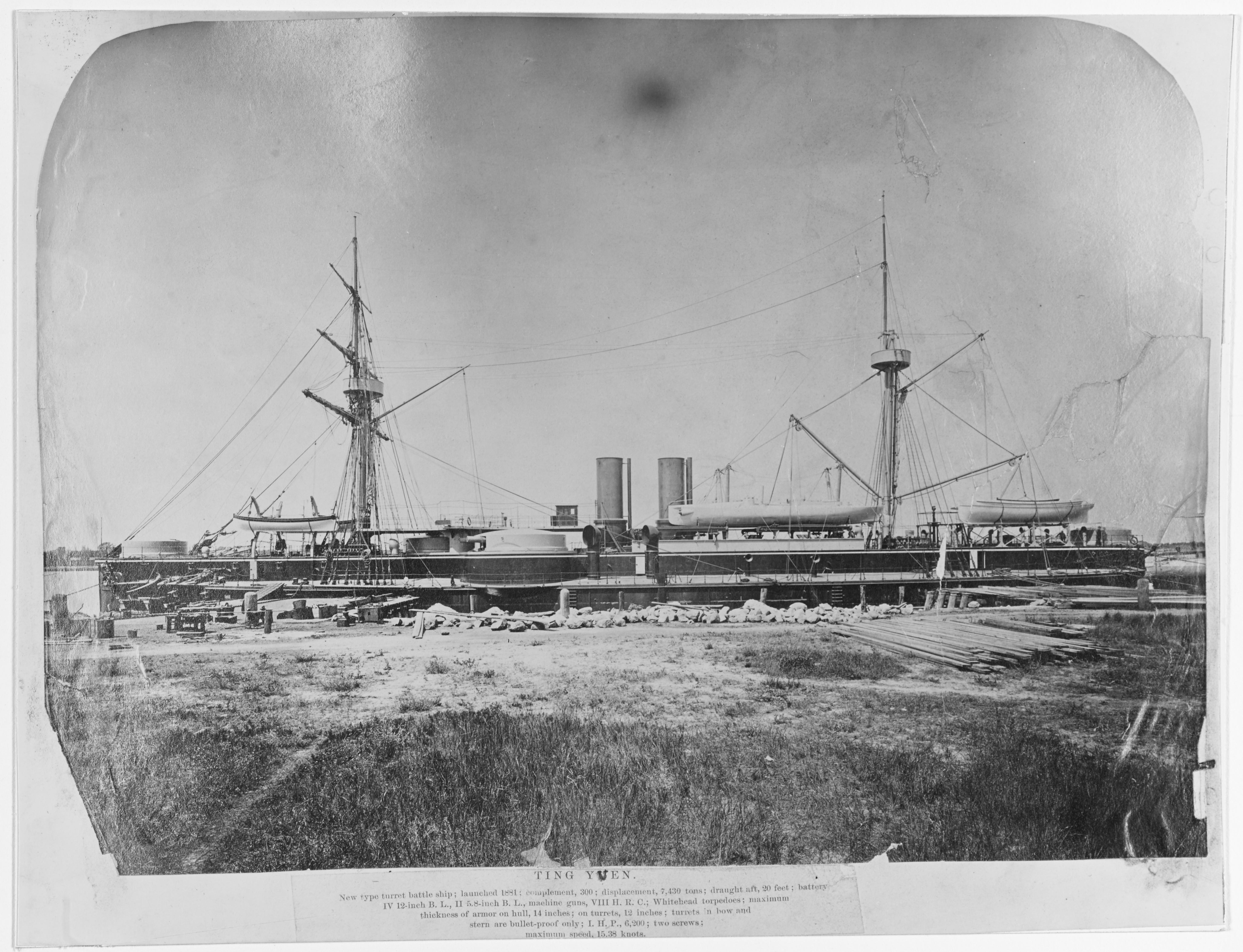
Chinese turret ship Dingyuan, built by AG Vulcan Stettin in 1881 for the Chinese Imperial Beiyang Fleet

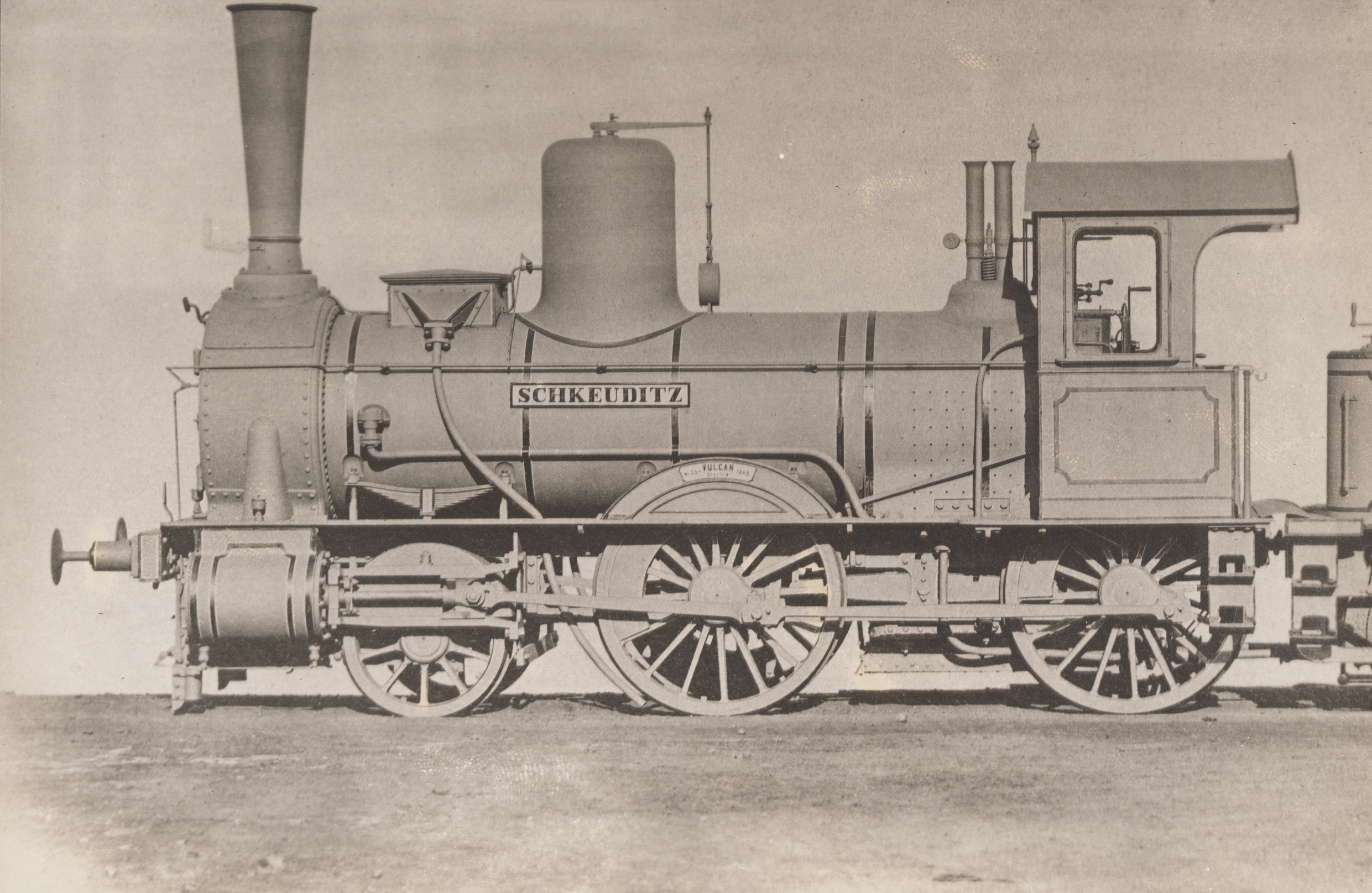
One of the early steam locomotives built at AG Vulcan Stettin, 1869.

A.G. Vulcan Stettin was founded 1851 as Schiffswerft und Maschinenfabrik Früchtenicht & Brock by the two young engineers Franz F. D. Früchtenicht and Franz W. Brock in the little village Bredow, which later became suburb of the Prussian city of Stettin. Its first ship was the small iron paddle steamer, named Die Dievenow for the service between the cities of Stettin and Swinemünde. Several small vessels followed, while the yard continuously was enlarged.

When the yard went into financial problems, in 1857 the company was taken over by some entrepreneurs and politicians from Stettin and Berlin which founded the new company Stettiner Maschinenbau Actien-Gesellschaft Vulcan. Ship construction was continued, but the solution of the financial trouble was expected by additionally constructing locomotives. A subsidiary company was founded, called Abteilung Locomotivbau in Bredow bei Stettin. In 1859 the first locomotive was delivered; all together the company built about 4,000 units in Stettin until it was sold to the Berlin company Borsig.

In the future larger and larger ships were built, the facilities in Stettin could no longer sustain the scale of the operations. The yard built the Kaiser-class ocean liners.

Thus a new shipyard was built in Hamburg between 1907 and 1909. From 1911, it was named Vulcan-Werke Hamburg und Stettin Actiengesellschaft. The Hamburg yard was the scene of a week-long strike in 1918 which was only brought to a close through the reading of the War Clauses.

=== Automatic transmissions for motor vehicles ===
Gustav Bauer, director of the marine engine section, supervised the work of Hermann Föttinger on the Fottinger hydraulic transmitter known as Vulcan Coupling and Vulcan Drive or fluid coupling. In 1924, Vulcan's Hermann Rieseler invented one of the first automatic transmissions, which had a two-speed planetary gearbox, torque converter, and lockup clutch; it never entered production. (The less-sophisticated Hydra-Matic, which used a simple fluid coupling, was an available option on Oldsmobiles in 1940.) The original coupling further developed in collaboration with Harold Sinclair of Fluidrive Engineering of Isleworth for Daimler of Coventry and matched with a manually controlled epicyclic gearbox went into production in England in 1929.

=== Shutdown ===
In 1928 Vulcan Stettin went bankrupt and sold its Hamburg shipyard in 1930. The AG Vulcan Stettin had been closed.

=== New enterprise ===
1939 a new company - also named Vulcan - was founded on the site of the former Stettin-shipyard. All together 34 construction numbers were started in the following years, including 18 type-VII C submarines. But because of the war only a few ships could be launched and completed. Among these were two submarines, but only one of them (U-901) was ever in service while the second one (U-902) was destroyed by allied air attacks before. During the war the yard exploited slave workers and had its own prisoner camp, part of the prisoner population engaged in anti-Nazi resistance, successfully sabotaging several constructed ships. The Polish resistance also conducted espionage of the company.

After World War II the slave workers were freed and the shipyard was finally taken over by the Polish government and the new Szczecin Shipyard was started at this site. The Szczecin Shipyard named one of its wharfs "Wulkan" and two slipways "Wulkan 1" and "Wulkan Nowa".

=== Ships built by AG Vulcan Stettin (selection) ===
- 1851, Constr.No. 1, Paddle steamer Die Dievenow, first built ship
- 1873, CNo. 66, SMS Preussen, first ironclad warship build
- 1877, CNo. 74, SMS Sachsen, ironclad warship
- 1879, Russian steamboat Askold for Shipping Company on the Don, Azov and Black Seas with their tributaries (Russian: Общество пароходства по Дону, Азовскому и Черному морям с их притоками). After 1886 belonged to Russian Steam Navigation and Trading Company
- 1880, Corvette Olga
- 1881–1882, Dingyuan and Zhenyuan for Chinese Navy
- 1887, Irene-class protected cruiser SMS Irene for Kaiserliche Marine (Imperial German Navy); 1922 broken up
- 1889, Scandia Hamburg America Line liner, sold to U.S. Army Quartermaster Department 1898 serving as U.S. Army Transport Warren until 1922, sold, burned sunk Shanghai 1924
- 1891, Brandenburg-class battleship SMS Brandenburg for Kaiserliche Marine, 1910 sold to the Osman Navy
- 1892, Aviso and imperial yacht SMY Hohenzollern for Kaiser Wilhelm II; 1923 broken up
- 1897, 4-funnel Kaiser-class ocean liner Kaiser Wilhelm der Grosse, won 1898 Blue Riband
- 1897, Passenger ship Königin Luise for Norddeutscher Lloyd (NDL), 1935 broken up
- 1897–1899, Victoria Louise-class great cruisers SMS Hertha and SMS Hansa
- 1899, Steamer König Albert for NDL, 1926 broken up
- 1901, Pre-dreadnought battleship SMS Mecklenburg for Kaiserliche Marine
- 1900, Passenger ship Deutschland
- 1902, 4-funnel Kaiser-class ocean liner Kaiser Wilhelm II
- 1902, Pre-dreadnought battleship SMS Preussen for Kaiserliche Marine
- 1903, Torpedo boat SMS Eber
- 1903–1904, Bremen-class cruisers SMS Hamburg and SMS Lübeck for Kaiserliche Marine
- 1905, Pre-dreadnought Deutschland-class battleship SMS Pommern for Kaiserliche Marine; sunk in Battle of Jütland in June 1916
- 1906, Passenger ship Kaiserin Auguste Victoria
- 1906, 4-funnel Kaiser-class ocean liner Kronprinzessin Cecilie
- 1907, Königsberg-class light cruiser SMS Stettin for Kaiserliche Marine
- 1906–1907, Niki-class destroyers Niki, Doxa, Aspis and Velos for the Hellenic Royal Navy
- 1909, Magdeburg-class cruiser SMS Breslau for Kaiserliche Marine, became later Osman cruiser Midilli, sunk 1918 by mines
- 1907, Passenger ship König Wilhelm II
- 1907, Passenger ship George Washington
- 1907, Nassau-class battleship SMS Rheinland for Kaiserliche Marine
- 1909, CNo. 294, small experimental ship Föttinger Transformator with steam turbine and hydrodynamic transmission (Föttinger Transformator) propulsion
- 1909, Kolberg-class cruiser SMS Mainz for Kaiserliche Marine; sunk 1914 in the Battle of Helgoland Bight
- 1910, cruiser ROU Uruguay, for National Navy of Uruguay. Out of service in 1951, scrapped in the 1960s.
- 1912, Destroyers Nea Genea (ex-German V-class destroyer V6) and Keravnos (ex-V5) for the Hellenic Royal Navy
- 1914, Imperial yacht SMY Hohenzollern for Kaiser Wilhelm II, not in service, 1923 scrapped in Hamburg
- 1915, Wiesbaden-class SMS Wiesbaden for Kaiserliche Marine
- 1913, Passenger ship Tirpitz for HAPAG, not finished during war, 1919 British war-booty and renamed RMS Empress of Australia, 1952 scrapped
- 1913, Passenger ship Sierra Cordoba for Norddeutscher Lloyd, supply ship for German raiders in World War I, seized by Peru 1917, renamed Callao, chartered by United States Shipping Board (USSB) and transferred to U.S. Navy 26 April 1919 and commissioned USS Callao (ID-4036), decommissioned 20 September 1919. Sold at auction by USSB, renamed Ruth Alexander by Dollar Steamship Lines.
- 1914–1918, All together 32 torpedo boats (SMS V25 - V30, SMS V43 - V48, SMS V67 - V84, SMS V108 and SMS V116)
- 1915, Brummer-class cruiser SMS Brummer and SMS Bremse for Kaiserliche Marine, 1918 both internment in Scapa Flow
- 1916–1917, Cöln-class cruiser Rostock and Wiesbaden, both not finished before the end of the war
- 1922, Passenger steamer München for NDL, 1931 renamed General von Steuben and 1938 only Steuben, sunk 1945 in the Baltic Sea by Soviet submarine S-13, about 3,000 people, mainly refugees, killed
- 1923, Passenger steamer Stuttgart for NDL, sunk 1943 by US Air Force
- 1926, Passenger ship Cobra for beach resort service, used as minelayer in WWII, 1942 sunk by Royal Air Force in Rotterdam
- 1941, Type VII-C U-boats U-901 and U-902, but only U 901 was ever in service

=== Ships built by AG Vulcan Hamburg (selection) ===
- 1911/12, Kaiser-class battleship SMS Friedrich der Grosse for Kaiserliche Marine
- 1913/14, Passenger ship Imperator
- 1913/14, König-class battleship SMS Grosser Kurfürst for Kaiserliche Marine
- 1913/14, Merchant ship Cap Trafalgar
- 1914, Battleship Salamis for Hellenic Navy, construction stopped with beginning of war, 1932 scrapped in Bremen
- 1915–1917, All together 69 U-boats of types UE 1, UE 2, UB III, UC I and UC II for Kaiserliche Marine
- 1916, Modified Mackensen-class battlecruiser SMS Ersatz Yorck (Replacement Yorck), construction stopped and after war broken up
- 1917, Bayern-class battleship SMS Württemberg for Kaiserliche Marine, not finished before end of war
- 1922, Merchant ship Cap Norte

== Ships built by AG Vulcan Stettin (selection) ==
=== Civilian ships ===
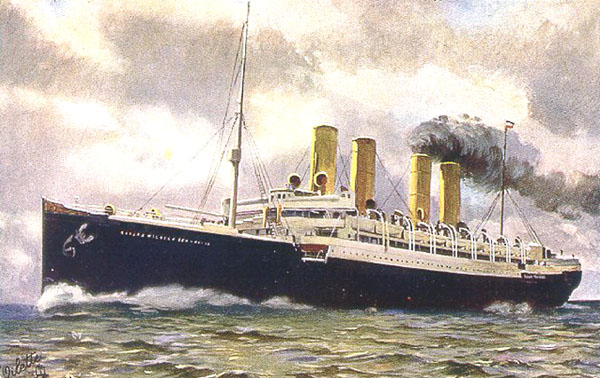
Drawing of the Kaiser Wilhelm der Grosse by an unknown painter

- Kaiser Wilhelm der Grosse (1896)
- Deutschland (1900)
- Kronprinz Wilhelm (1901)
- Kaiser Wilhelm II (1902)
- Kaiserin Auguste Victoria (1906)
- Kronprinzessin Cecilie (1906)
- Konig Wilhelm II (1907)
- George Washington (1907)
- Tirpitz (1913)
- Imperator (1910)

=== Naval ships ===
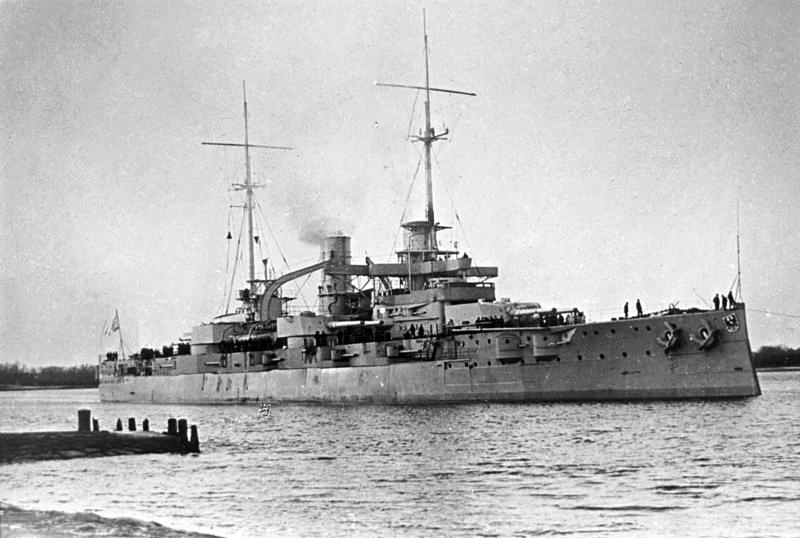
SMS Rheinland

==== Battleships ====
- Chinese turret ship Dingyuan (1881)
- Chinese turret ship Zhenyuan (1882)
- SMS Brandenburg (1890)
- SMS Weissenburg (1890)
- SMS Mecklenburg (1900)
- SMS Preussen (1902)
- SMS Pommern (1904)
- SMS Rheinland (1907)

==== Cruisers ====
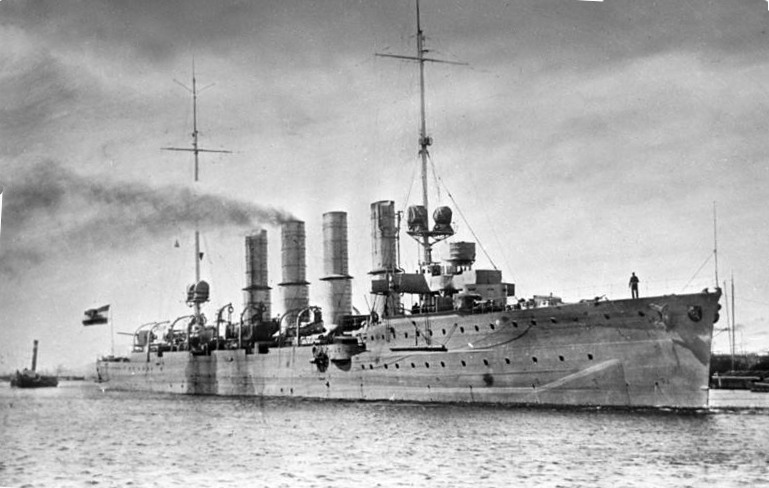
SMS Breslau

- Chinese cruiser Jiyuan (1883)
- SMS Irene (1887)
- Chinese cruiser Jingyuan (1887)
- Chinese cruiser Laiyuan (1887)
- Chinese cruiser Hai Yung (1897)
- Japanese cruiser Yakumo (1897)
- SMS Hertha (1897)
- SMS Hansa (1898)
- Russian cruiser Bogatyr (1901)
- SMS Hamburg (1902)
- SMS Lübeck (1903)
- SMS Stettin (1906)
- SMS Mainz (1908)
- SMS Breslau (1910)
- SMS Wiesbaden (1913)
- SMS Brummer (1915)
- SMS Bremse (1915)
- SMS Wiesbaden (1915)

==== Destroyers ====
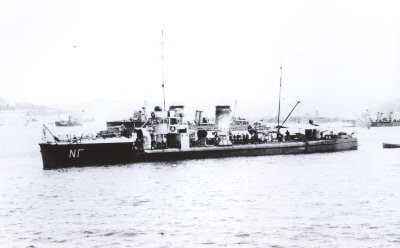
Nea Genea

- Greek destroyer Niki (1906)
- Greek destroyer Doxa (1906)
- Greek destroyer Aspis (1907)
- Greek destroyer Velos (1907)
- Greek destroyer Nea Genea (1912)
- Greek destroyer Keravnos (1912)

==== Submarines (U-boats) ====
- Type VII-C U-boats (1941), out of six ordered, only one, U-901 was commissioned.

==== Torpedo Boats ====
- SMS V25 (1914)
- SMS V26 (1914)
- SMS V27 (1914)
- SMS V28 (1914)
- SMS V29 (1914)
- SMS V30 (1914)
- SMS V43 (1915)
- SMS V44 (1915)
- SMS V45 (1915)
- SMS V46 (1915)
- SMS V47 (1915)
- SMS V48 (1915)
- SMS V67 (1915)
- SMS V68 (1915)
- SMS V69 (1916)
- SMS V70 (1916)
- SMS V71 (1916)
- SMS V72 (1916)
- SMS V73 (1916)
- SMS V74 (1916)
- SMS V75 (1916)
- SMS V76 (1916)
- SMS V77 (1916)
- SMS V78 (1916)
- SMS V79 (1916)
- SMS V80 (1916)
- SMS V81 (1916)
- SMS V82 (1916)
- SMS V83 (1916)
- SMS V84 (1916)
- SMS V108, ex-Dutch Z-4, later Polish ORP Kaszub
- SMS V116 (1918)

== Ships still afloat ==
- Gryfia, ex-Tyras (1887), small railway ferry, today in Szczecin, Poland
- Wittow (1895), small railway ferry, today shown in the harbour of Barth, Germany
- Icebreaker Suur Tõll (1914), today a museum ship in Tallinn Icebrecher Stettin Hamburg Museum Ship
