= Greek destroyer Nea Genea =

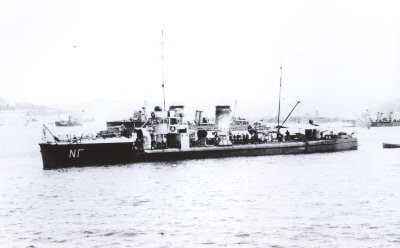
- Nea Genea (ex-German V-6)

History

Greece
- Name: Nea Genea
- Ordered: 1911
- Laid down: 1911
- Launched: 29 February 1912
- Commissioned: 1912
- Decommissioned: 1919
- Fate: Scrapped

General characteristics
- Class & type: V1-class destroyer
- Displacement: 570 tons standard
- Length: 70.20 m (230 ft 4 in)
- Beam: 7.60 m (24 ft 11 in)
- Draft: 3.10 m (10 ft 2 in)
- Propulsion: AEG-Vulcan 4 coal burning, 2 funnels
- Speed: 32 knots (59 km/h; 37 mph) maximum
- Armament: 2 × 8.8 cm (3.5 in) SK L/30 guns; 4 × 500 mm (20 in) torpedo tubes

Nea Genea (Greek: Α/Τ Νέα Γενεά, "New Generation") was a destroyer that served in the Royal Hellenic Navy from 1912 to 1919. She was originally the German destroyer V-6.

== Service ==
The ship, along with one of her six sister ships of V-class destroyers, Keravnos, was ordered from Germany. They were purchased before entering service in the German Navy, from the German shipyard Vulcan AG in Stettin, when the Balkan Wars were underway.

Later, during World War I, Greece belatedly entered the war on the side of the Triple Entente and, due to Greece's neutrality the two ex-German V-class ships were seized by the Allies in October 1916, taken over by the French in November and served in the French Navy from 1917 to 1918. By 1918, they were back on escort duty under Greek colors, mainly in the Aegean Sea.

Nea Genea was stricken in 1919 and scrapped in 1922.

== See also ==
- History of the Hellenic Navy
