= Greek destroyer Niki (1906) =

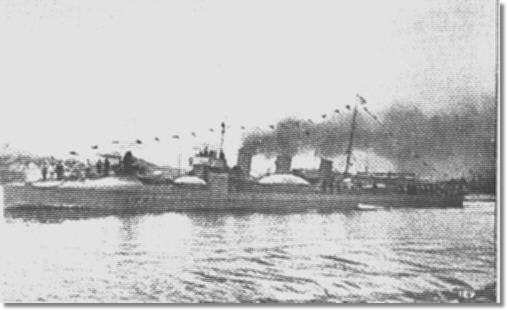

History

Greece
- Name: Niki
- Ordered: 1905
- Builder: Stettiner Vulcan AG
- Laid down: 1905
- Launched: 30 May 1906
- Commissioned: 1906
- Decommissioned: 1945
- Fate: Broken up

General characteristics
- Class & type: Niki-class destroyer
- Displacement: 350 long tons (360 t)
- Length: 67 m (220 ft)
- Beam: 6.1 m (20 ft)
- Draft: 2.7 m (8 ft 10 in)
- Installed power: 6,800 hp (5,100 kW)
- Propulsion: 2 shafts
- Speed: Maximum 30 knots (56 km/h; 35 mph)
- Armament: 2 × 3-inch (76 mm) 12-pounder Hotchkiss; 4 × 57 mm 6-pounder/40cal Hotchkiss QF; 2 × 18-inch (457 mm) torpedo tubes

Niki (Greek: Τ/Β Νίκη, "Victory") was a Niki-class destroyer that served in the Royal Hellenic Navy (1907–1945).

The ship, along with her three sister ships, was ordered from Germany in 1905 and was built in the Vulcan shipyard at Stettin.

During World War I, Greece did not enter the war on the side of the Triple Entente until 1917 and, due to Greece's neutrality the four Niki-class ships had been seized by the Allies in October 1916, taken over by the French in November and served in the French Navy from 1917 to 1918. By 1918, they were back on escort duty under Greek colors, mainly in the Aegean Sea.

Niki saw action in the Greco-Turkish War (1919–1922). In 1919, she conducted escort missions in the Black Sea carrying Greek refugees from Pontus. Later, while covering the Greek Army's disorganized retreat after the fall of Smyrna on September 4, 1922, Niki's commander, Lieutenant Commander D. Hatziskos was killed by a sniper.

After the war, Niki was refurbished from 1925 to 1927. She also participated in the Second World War, first carrying supplies in the Ionian Sea and after surviving the German invasion of April 1941, Niki served in conjunction with the Royal Navy based in Alexandria, Egypt. After the end of World War II, Niki was stricken in 1945.

== See also ==
- History of the Hellenic Navy
