= Greek destroyer Keravnos =

- Keravnos (ex-German V-5)

History

Greece
- Name: Keravnos
- Ordered: 1911
- Laid down: 1911
- Launched: 22 May 1912
- Commissioned: 1912
- Decommissioned: 1919
- Fate: Scrapped

General characteristics
- Class & type: V1-class destroyer
- Displacement: 570 tons standard
- Length: 70.20 m (230 ft 4 in)
- Beam: 7.60 m (24 ft 11 in)
- Draft: 3.10 m (10 ft 2 in)
- Propulsion: AEG-Vulcan 4 coal burning, 2 funnels
- Speed: 32 knots (59 km/h; 37 mph)
- Armament: 2 × 8.8 cm (3.5 in) SK L/30 guns; 4 × 500 mm (20 in) torpedo tubes

Keravnos (Greek: Α/Τ Κεραυνός, "Thunderbolt") was a destroyer that served in the Royal Hellenic Navy from 1912 to 1919. She was originally the German destroyer V-5.

== Service ==
The ship, along with one of her six sister ships of V-class destroyers, Nea Genea, was ordered from Germany. They were purchased before entering service in the German Navy, from the German shipyard Vulcan AG in Stettin, when the Balkan Wars were underway.

Later, during World War I, Greece belatedly entered the war on the side of the Triple Entente and, due to Greece's neutrality the two ex-German V-class ships were seized by the Allies in October 1916, taken over by the French in November and served in the French Navy from 1917–18. By 1918, they were back on escort duty under Greek colors, mainly in the Aegean Sea. With the Armistice in 1918, Keravnos was ordered to Constantinople and later to Russia during the Russian Civil War.

According to the Executive Officer, Gregory Mezeviris, RHN, "We stayed a few days in Constantinople and then the destroyer Keravnos was ordered to sail to the port of Vatum in the Black Sea. This mission was finally cancelled because after sailing for a few hours we faced such adverse weather conditions that our ship with her defective engines could hardly cope with and we had to put back into port. When the weather conditions improved, we were ordered to sail to Sebastopol to reinforce the Greek Squadron anchored there, comprising the battleship Kilkis and some destroyers."

Keravnos was stricken in 1919 and scrapped in 1922.

== See also ==
- History of the Hellenic Navy

== Sources ==
- Russian Naval Encyclopedia
- Greek Naval ships of World War I
