= EADS 3 Sigma Nearchos =

Greek reconnaissance unmanned aerial vehicle

Nearchos

General information
- Type: Unmanned Aerial Vehicle
- National origin: Greece
- Manufacturer: EADS 3 Sigma

History
- Introduction date: 1996

The EADS 3 Sigma Nearchos is a medium distance reconnaissance unmanned aerial vehicle (UAV) introduced in 1996, one of several UAVs developed by the Greek 3 Sigma (since 2002 EADS 3 Sigma) aerospace company, in collaboration with Greek universities.

== Uses ==
=== Military ===
- Battlefield surveillance
- Aerial reconnaissance
- Target acquisition
- Damage assessment
- ESM/ECM
- Communication data relay

=== Civilian ===
- Geological and maritime applications
- Traffic surveillance
- Localization of polluted areas and natural disaster areas
- Border and forestry patrolling
- Forest fire detection

== Specifications (Nearchos) ==
Data from

General characteristics

- Capacity: 92 kg (203 lb) payload
- Length: 3.95 m (13 ft 0 in)
- Wingspan: 5.1 m (16 ft 9 in)
- Height: 1.15 m (3 ft 9 in)
- Empty weight: 60 kg (132 lb)
- Max takeoff weight: 110 kg (243 lb)
- Powerplant: 1 × any suitable small piston engine, 28.3 kW (38.0 hp)

Performance

- Maximum speed: 220 km/h (140 mph, 120 kn)
- Endurance: 12 hours
- Service ceiling: 7,000 m (23,000 ft)

Further development was terminated after the company went out of business in 2012.

== See also ==
Related lists

- List of unmanned aerial vehicles

== External links/References ==
- Company website (archived)
