= Greek destroyer Doxa (1906) =

Greek naval destroyer

- Doxa - Δόξα

History

Greece
- Name: Doxa
- Ordered: 1905
- Builder: Stettiner Vulcan AG, Stettin
- Laid down: 1905
- Launched: 18 July 1906
- Commissioned: 1906
- Fate: Sunk 27 June 1917, in Straits of Messina

General characteristics
- Class & type: Niki-class destroyer
- Displacement: 350 long tons (360 t) standard
- Length: 67 m (219 ft 10 in)
- Beam: 6.1 m (20 ft 0 in)
- Draft: 2.7 m (8 ft 10 in)
- Installed power: 6,800 hp (5,100 kW)
- Propulsion: 2 shafts
- Speed: Maximum 30 knots (56 km/h; 35 mph)
- Armament: 2 × 3-inch (76 mm) 12-pounder Hotchkiss; 2 × 57 mm 6-pounder/40 cal Hotchkiss QF; 2 × 18-inch (457 mm) torpedo tubes

The Greek destroyer (τορπιλλοβόλον) Doxa (Greek: Δόξα, "glory"), served in the Royal Hellenic Navy from 1907–1917. She was one of four Niki-class destroyers ordered from Germany in 1905 and was built in the Vulcan shipyard at Stettin.

She saw action in the First Balkan War in 1912–13 under Alexandros Chatzikyriakos. During World War I, Greece did not enter the war on the side of the Triple Entente until 1917 and, due to Greece's neutrality the four Niki-class ships had been seized by the Allies in October 1916, taken over by the French in November and served in the French Navy until 1917. On 27 June 1917, while serving with the French Navy on escort duty, Doxa was attacked and sunk by the Imperial German Navy submarine UB-47 in the Straits of Messina at 38°08′N 15°35′E, resulting in 29 deaths.

== See also ==
- History of the Hellenic Navy
