= C15TA armoured truck =

Canadian armoured truck

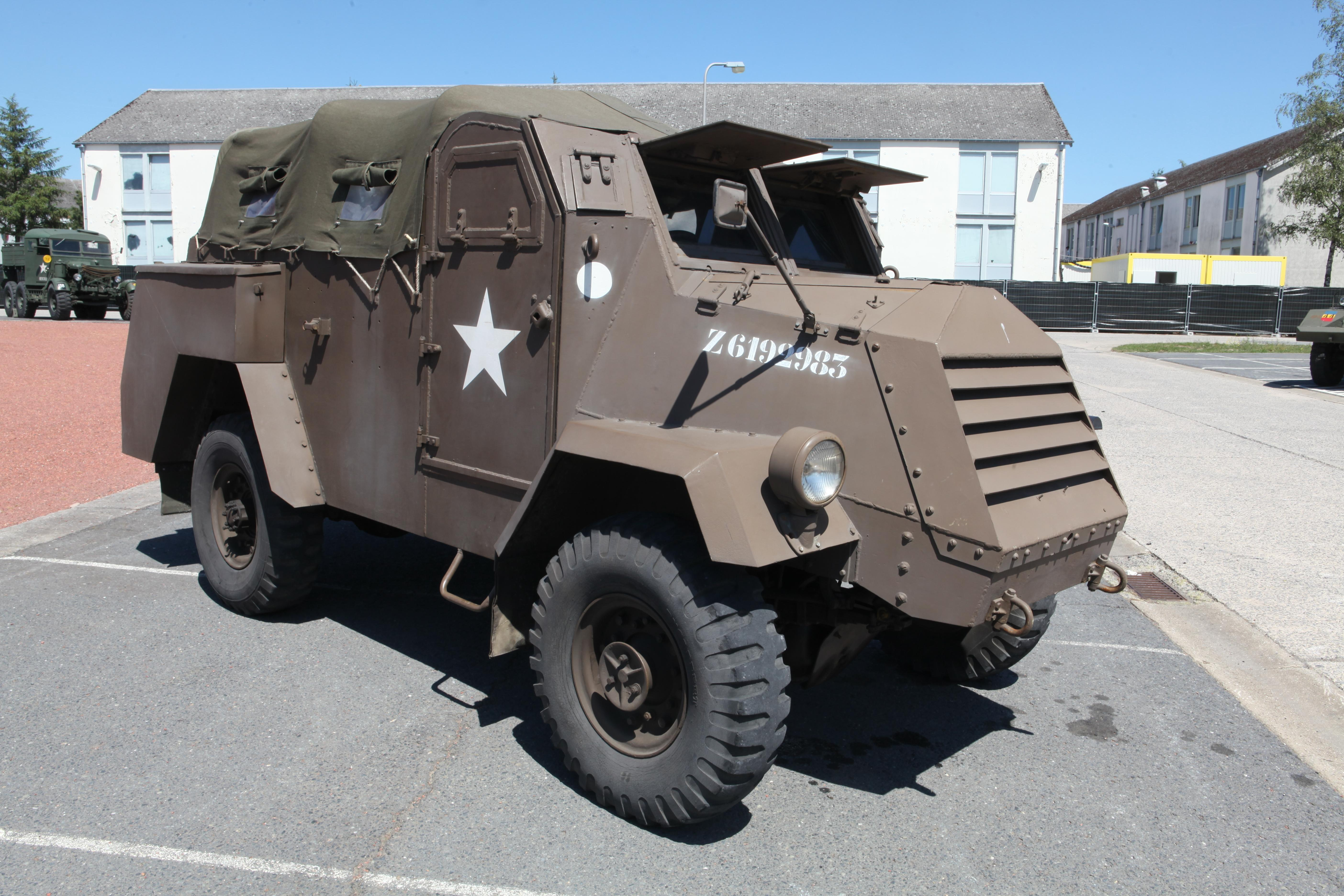
- C15TA seen at Bastogne Barracks
- Type: Armoured truck
- Place of origin: Canada

Service history
- Wars: World War II; Greek Civil War; Malayan Emergency; Indonesian National Revolution; First Indochina War; Vietnam War; Portuguese Colonial War

Production history
- Manufacturer: General Motors Canada

Specifications
- Mass: 4.5 t
- Length: 15 ft 7 in (4.75 m)
- Width: 7 ft 7 in (2.31 m)
- Height: 7 ft 7 in (2.31 m)
- Crew: 2
- Passengers: 6-8
- Armour: 6–14 mm (0.24–0.55 in) (Note: 14 mm on front, 6 mm on sides)
- Engine: GMC 270 6-cylinder 4.41L gasoline 100 bhp (75 kW) (Note: 95 bhp at 3,000 rpm but engine governed to 2,750 rpm)
- Power/weight: 22.2 hp/tonne
- Drive: 4×4 wheel
- Transmission: 4 forward, 1 reverse gear, with two-speed transfer box
- Suspension: leaf spring
- Maximum speed: 65 km/h (40 mph)

The C15TA armoured truck, formally described as "Truck, 15 cwt., armoured", (Note: In British/Canadian terminology truck was used for vehicles with smaller load capacities and lorry for larger ones. In this case the capacity was 15 long hundredweight (760 kg)) was an armoured load carrier produced by Canada during the Second World War. It was developed from the Otter light reconnaissance car.

== Development ==
The C15TA armoured truck was developed by General Motors Canada along a concept lines of the American M3 scout car. The vehicle used the chassis of the Chevrolet C15 Canadian Military Pattern truck design. Between 1943 and 1945 a total of 3,961 units were built in Oshawa, Ontario. Armoured hulls were supplied by the Hamilton Bridge Company.

In 1943 the Canadian Army policy was to use the 'CAPLAD' 3-ton armoured lorry then in development for their personnel and ammunition carrying needs for the invasion of France. At the time the British were using the White scout armoured car but production of that was ending. The CAPLAD was cancelled as not meeting requirements and it was decided to use the 15-cwt and American-built M14 half track trucks for personnel and ammunition carrying respectively. By January 1944, although 800 vehicles had been ordered there were delays to production due to strikes. As such the Canadian Army issued White Scouts in lieu of the C15TA. With further delays, the Canadian Army adopted the same proportions of White Scouts and M14s as the British and were supplied with sufficient of these via the UK to meet their needs. In May 1944, 21 C15TA s were issued to the 3rd Canadian Infantry Division.

The truck had a seating in the rear for eight, the large panniers on the outside over the rear wheels could hold the large haversacks of the troops (four either side) with internal baskets for smaller packs. The canvas tilt over the cab was supported on hoops. On the rear was a carrier for petrol, oil and water jerrycans.

== Variants ==
Apart from the personnel carrier, ammunition carrier and General Service (GS) fitted vehicles, there was an armoured ambulance version of the C15TA. This differed by having the side and rear armour extended up; it had internal fittings for two stretchers replacing the seating. The ambulance entered production late in the war.

== Service ==
The C15TA was used by the British and Canadian units in the Northwest Europe campaign as armoured personnel carrier and ambulance (CT15AA),

After the end of the hostilities, many vehicles were left in Europe and were subsequently employed by armies of the liberated European countries, including Belgium, Greece, Denmark (as M6 Mosegris), the Netherlands (which received at least 396 units), and Norway. In addition about 150 were sold by Canada to Spain. Trucks left by the British forces in Vietnam were taken over by the French, which used them in Indochina and later transferred them to South Vietnam. A command variant was also exported to the Union of South Africa.

Many C15TAs were employed by the police forces of the Federation of Malaya.

In 1955, Portugal received from Canada a number of vehicles, locally known as GM 4x4 m/947 Granadeiro (Grenadier). They were later employed by the Portuguese Army in Guinea-Bissau and Mozambique during the African wars, with some vehicles remaining in service until the 1960s.

== Operators ==
- Belgium
- Canada
- Denmark
- France
- Francoist Spain
- Greece
- Malaysia – used by the Royal Malaysia Police.
- Netherlands
- Norway
- Portugal – used by the Portuguese Army.
- South Vietnam – used by the Vietnamese National Army (VNA) and the Army of the Republic of Vietnam (ARVN).
- Union of South Africa – used by the South African Defence Force (SADF).

== Surviving vehicles ==
- Royal Malaysia Police Museum, Kuala Lumpur
- Museum Perak, Taiping, Perak & Darul Ridzuan Museum, Ipoh
- Bukit Kepong Emergency Gallery (Malay in Galeri Darurat Bukit Kepong), Muar (town), Johor
- Museum Sultan Abu Bakar, Pekan, Pahang
- Army Museum, Port Dickson
- Terengganu State Museum, Kuala Terengganu
- Kedah State Museum, Alor Setar

== See also ==
- Otter light reconnaissance car
