= Greek corvette Loudovikos =

History

Greece
- Name: Loudovikos
- Namesake: King Ludwig I of Bavaria
- Builder: Poros Naval Shipyard, Poros
- Launched: 1838; 188 years ago
- Commissioned: 1838
- Decommissioned: 1873; 153 years ago
- Renamed: Messolongion, 1862

General characteristics
- Displacement: 1,000 long tons (1,016 t)
- Length: 44.1 m (145 ft)
- Complement: 182
- Armament: 2 × 22-pounder guns; 4 × 20-pounder long guns; 24 × 32-pounder carronades

Loudovikos was a corvette of the Hellenic Navy built in 1838 at the Poros Naval Shipyard, designed by naval architect Georgios Tombazis. It was named after King Ludwig I of Bavaria, the father of King Otto of Greece.

It was a relatively large ship (length 44.1 m, 1000-ton displacement), was armed with two 22-lb plus four 20-lb long guns, and twenty-four 32-lb carronades, and had a crew of 182. The ship was not operationally utilized, and since 1846 it was used as a training ship (renamed Messolongion after the ousting of Otto in 1862). It officially remained in service with the Royal Hellenic Navy until 1873.
