= Greek destroyer Velos (1907) =

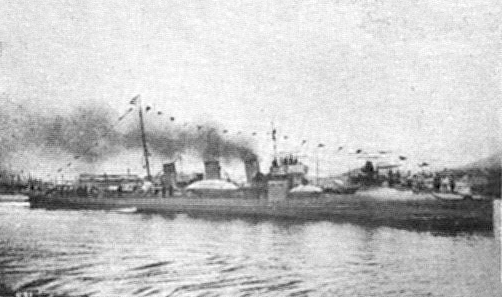
- Velos - Βέλος

History

Greece
- Ordered: 1905
- Builder: Stettiner Vulcan AG, Stettin
- Laid down: 1905
- Launched: 8 May 1907
- Commissioned: 1907
- Decommissioned: 1926
- Fate: Sold for scrap

General characteristics
- Class & type: Niki-class destroyer
- Displacement: 350 tons standard
- Length: 67 m (220 ft)
- Beam: 6.1 m (20 ft)
- Draft: 2.7 m (8 ft 10 in)
- Installed power: 6,800 hp (5,100 kW)
- Propulsion: 2 shafts
- Speed: Maximum 30 knots (56 km/h; 35 mph)
- Armament: 2 × 3-inch (76 mm) 12-pounder Hotchkiss; 4 × 57 mm 6-pounder/40cal Hotchkiss QF; 2 × 18-inch (457 mm) torpedo tubes

Velos (Greek: Τ/Β Βέλος, "Arrow") was a Niki-class destroyer that served in the Royal Hellenic Navy from 1907 to 1926.

The ship, along with her three sister ships, was ordered from Germany in 1905 and was built in the Vulcan shipyard at Stettin.

During World War I, Greece did not enter the war on the side of the Triple Entente until 1917 and, due to Greece's neutrality the four Niki-class ships had been seized by the Allies in October 1916, taken over by the French in November and served in the French Navy from 1917 to 1918. By 1918, they were back on escort duty under Greek colors, mainly in the Aegean Sea.

Velos saw action in the Greco-Turkish War (1919-1922). In 1918, after the Armistice of Moudros, Velos entered the Dardanelles with the Allied fleet and was, under the command of Lieutenant Commander Petros Voulgaris, the first Greek warship to enter Constantinople. In 1919, she conducted escort missions in the Black Sea carrying Greek refugees from Pontus.

Velos was stricken in 1926, while the two remaining Niki-class ships were refurbished.

== See also ==
- History of the Hellenic Navy

== Bibliography ==
- Mach, Andrzej V. (1985). "Greece". In Gray, Randal (ed.). Conway's All the World's Fighting Ships 1906–1921. Annapolis, Maryland: Naval Institute Press. pp. 382–387. ISBN 0-85177-245-5.

== Sources ==
- Official Website of Velos (in Greek)
