= Niki-class destroyer =

Class overview
- Name: Niki
- Builders: AG Vulcan Stettin
- Operators: Hellenic Navy
- Preceded by: none
- Succeeded by: Aetos
- Planned: 4
- Completed: 4

General characteristics
- Type: Destroyer
- Displacement: 275 normal load; 350 tons full load
- Length: 67 m (219 ft 10 in)
- Beam: 6.1 m (20 ft)
- Draught: 2.7 m (8 ft 10 in)
- Speed: 30 knots (56 km/h; 35 mph)
- Endurance: 1,250 nmi (2,320 km; 1,440 mi) at 15 kn (28 km/h; 17 mph)
- Complement: 58
- Armament: 2 × 76 mm (3.0 in) (12-pdr Hotchkiss); 4 × 57 mm (2.2 in) (6-pdr 40 cal Hotchkiss QF); 2 × 450 mm (18 in) torpedo tubes in trainable deck mountings
- Armour: 2-7.6cm/2-5.7cm/2-45.7cm tt
- Notes: Ships in class include: Niki, Aspis, Doxa and Velos.

The Niki class of destroyers were ordered by the Royal Hellenic Navy before World War I when the Greek government embarked on a naval buildup after losing the Greco-Turkish War of 1897. These four ships were ordered from Germany in 1905 and were built in the Vulcan shipyard at Stettin.

During World War I, these ships were seized by the French Navy when Greece did not enter the war on the side of the allies, and were returned to the Hellenic Royal Navy in 1917 when Greece declared war.

The class consisted of four destroyers: Niki, Aspis, Doxa and Velos.
