= History of the Hellenic Navy =

The history of the Hellenic Navy (Greek: Πολεμικό Ναυτικό) begins with the birth of modern Greece, and due to the maritime nature of the country, this force has been the premier service of the Greek Armed Forces.

== The navy and the Greek War of Independence ==
At the beginning of the Greek War of Independence, the naval forces of the Greeks consisted primarily of the merchant fleet of the Saronic islanders from Hydra, Spetsai and Poros and also the islanders of Psara and Samos. The fleet was of crucial importance to the success of the revolt. Its goal was to prevent the Ottoman Navy as much as possible from resupplying the isolated Ottoman garrisons and land reinforcements from the Ottoman Empire's Asian provinces. Albanians (Arvanites) served prominently in the Greek rebel fleet.

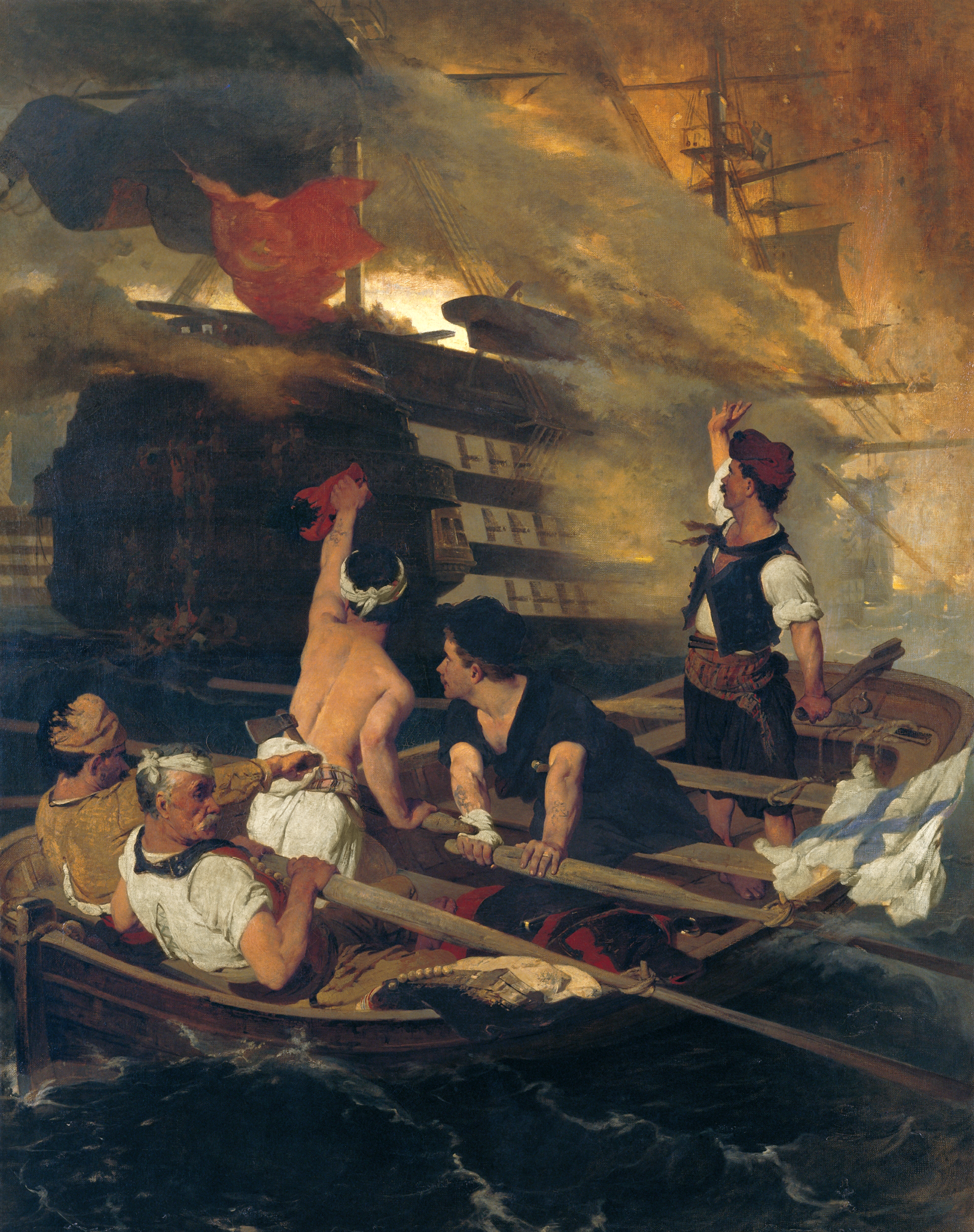
The destruction of the Turkish flagship at Chios by Kanaris

Although Greek crews consisted of experienced seamen, the light Greek ships, mostly armed merchantmen, were unable to stand up to the large Turkish ships of the line in direct combat. So the Greeks resorted to the use of fireships (Greek: πυρπολικά or μπουρλότα), with great success. In the use of such ships courageous seamen like Konstantinos Kanaris won international renown. Led by capable admirals, most prominently by Andreas Miaoulis of Hydra, the Greek fleet achieved early victories, guaranteeing the survival of the revolt in the mainland.

However, as Greece became embroiled in a civil war, the Sultan called upon his strongest subject, Muhammad Ali of Egypt, for aid. Plagued by internal strife and financial difficulties in keeping the fleet in constant readiness, the Greeks failed to prevent the capture and destruction of Kasos and Psara in 1824, or the landing of the Egyptian army at Modon — despite victories at Samos in August 1824 and at Gerontas in September 1824. The revolution seemed threatened with collapse until the intervention of the Great Powers in the Battle of Navarino in 1827. There the combined fleets of the Britain, the France and the Russian Empire decisively defeated the Egypto-Ottoman fleet, effectively securing the independence of Greece.

When Ioannis Capodistrias became Governor of newly liberated Greece in 1828, the Greek fleet consisted of a few remaining ships, which had participated in the war for independence. The first Minister for Naval Affairs was Konstantinos Kanaris, and the most powerful ship of the fleet at that time, the frigate Hellas, had been constructed in the United States in 1825. The Navy established its headquarters at the island of Poros and the building of a new series of ships began at the naval base while old ships were gradually retired. Furthermore, continuous efforts towards the education of officers were initiated. Young people were initially trained at the military school of Scholi Evelpidon and afterwards they were transferred to the navy, as there was no such thing as a Naval Academy.

In 1831, Greece descended into anarchy with numerous areas, including the Mani Peninsula and Hydra, in revolt. During this revolt the flagship Hellas, then docked at Poros, was set on fire by Admiral Andreas Miaoulis. Capodistrias was assassinated a few months after.

== The Royal Hellenic Navy of King Otto ==
Second Naval Ensign of Greece (1833–1858)

When the new King Otto arrived in the Greek capital, Nafplion, in 1832 aboard the British warship HMS Madagascar, the Greek fleet consisted of 1 corvette, 3 brigs, 6 gollettes, 2 gunboats, 2 steamboats and a few more small vessels. The first Naval School was founded in 1846 on the corvette Loudovikos and Leonidas Palaskas was assigned as its director. However the inefficient training of the officers, coupled with conflict between those who pursued modernization and those who were stalwarts of the traditions of the veterans of the struggle for independence, resulted in a restricted and inefficient navy, which was limited to policing the sea and the pursuit of pirates.

During the 1850s, the more progressive elements of the navy won out and the fleet was augmented with more ships. In 1855, the first iron propeller-driven ships were ordered from England. These were the steamships Panopi, Pliksavra, Afroessa, and Sfendoni.

== Growth of the navy under King George I ==
During the 1866 Cretan revolt, the ships of the Royal Hellenic Navy were in no condition to support it. Such failure led to the government awakening to the problem of naval insufficiency and the adoption of a policy stating that: "The navy, as it represents a necessary weapon for Greece, should only be created for war and aim to victory." Because of this, the fleet was supplied with new and bigger ships, reflecting a number of innovations including the use of iron in shipbuilding industry and the invention of the torpedo; with these advances, the effectiveness and the appearance of the Hellenic Navy changed.

Meanwhile, after 1878, because of the Russo-Turkish War and the need to expand the Greek navy, a new and larger naval base was established in the area of Faneromeni of Salamis and a few years later it was transferred to the area of Arapis where it remains today. At the same time the Naval Academy was founded and Ilias Kanellopoulos was made Director. In 1884, a French naval mission, headed by Admiral Laurent Joseph Lejeune, introduced a new, advanced naval organization and the methodological training of enlisted personnel through the establishment of a training school in the old building of the naval base in Poros.

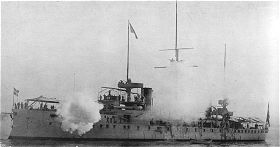
Battleship Psara

During the government of Charilaos Trikoupis in 1889, the fleet was further increased with the acquisition of new battleships:Hydra, Spetsai, and Psara from France. Thus, when Greece went to war in the Greco-Turkish War in 1897, the Hellenic Navy established its dominance in the Aegean Sea; however, it was unable to change the outcome of the war on land, which was a national humiliation.

In 1907, the Hellenic Navy General Staff (Γενικό Επιτελείο Ναυτικού) was founded, with then-Captain Pavlos Kountouriotis as its first head. After the war in 1897, the Ottoman Empire embarked on a program of naval expansion for its fleet and as a response to that, in 1909, the cruiser Georgios Averof was bought from Italy. In 1910, a British naval mission arrived, headed by Admiral Lionel Grant Tufnell, in order to recommend improvements in the organization and training of the navy. The mission led to the adoption of the English style of management, organization and training, especially in the area of strategy.

== World War I and after: 1914–1940 ==
For a list of ships in the fleet in this era, see The Hellenic Navy in 1917

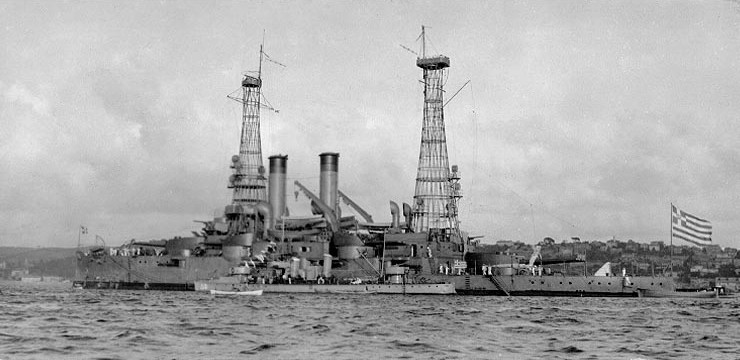
Greek battleship Lemnos at Constantinople in 1919

The Navy, shortly before the Balkan Wars, was composed of a destroyer and battleship fleet. Its mission was primarily offensive, aiming at capturing the Ottoman-held islands of the Eastern Aegean, and establish naval supremacy in the area. To that end, its commander-in-chief, Rear Admiral Pavlos Kountouriotis, established a forward base at the Moudros bay at Lemnos, directly opposite the Dardanelles straits. After defeating the two Turkish sallies from the Straits at Elli (December 1912) and Lemnos (January 1913), the Aegean Sea was secured for Greece.

The Balkan Wars were followed by a rapid escalation between Greece and the Ottoman Empire over the as yet unclear status of the islands of the Eastern Aegean. Both governments embarked on a naval armaments race, with Greece purchasing the obsolete battleships Lemnos and Kilkis and the light cruiser Elli as well as ordering two dreadnoughts, Vasilefs Konstantinos and the Salamis and a number of destroyers. However, with the outbreak of the First World War, construction of the dreadnoughts stopped.

Initially during the war, Greece followed a course of neutrality, with the Prime Minister Eleftherios Venizelos favoring the Entente and pro-German King Constantine I advocating neutrality. This dispute eventually led to a deep political conflict, known as the "National Schism". In November 1916, in order to apply pressure on the royal government in Athens, the French confiscated the Greek ships (see Noemvriana). They continued to operate with French crews, primarily in convoy escort and patrol duties in the Aegean, until Greece entered the war on the side of the Allies in July 1917, at which point they were returned to Greece. Subsequently, the Greek Navy took part in the Allied operations in the Aegean, in the Allied expedition in support of Denikin's White Armies in Ukraine, and in the operations of the Greco-Turkish War of 1919–1922 in Asia Minor.

After Greece's catastrophic defeat, the 1920s and early 1930s were a politically turbulent period, with the economy in a bad state, so the Navy received no new units, apart from the modernization of four destroyers and the acquisition of six French submarines in 1927 and four Italian destroyers in 1929.

== World War II ==
In 1938, Greece ordered four modern Greyhound-class destroyers in English shipyards, making a serious step towards modernization. The outbreak of war in Europe, however, allowed only two to be delivered. Greece entered World War II with a weak navy consisting of ten destroyers, two outdated battleships, two light cruisers and six submarines. On the eve of the Italian invasion in 1940, the RHN consisted of 34 ships and 6,500 men.

The Hellenic Navy suffered its first loss of the war on 15 August 1940 (two months before the formal outbreak of hostilities) when the cruiser Elli was sunk by the Italian submarine Delfino, possibly acting on Mussolini's orders. During the Greco-Italian War, the Navy took over convoy escort missions in the Aegean and the Ionian Sea and undertook three unsuccessful raids against the Italian supply convoys in the Strait of Otranto. The most important role was given to the submarines, which although obsolete, sank some Italian cargo ships in the Adriatic, losing one submarine in the process. The Greek submarine force (six boats) was however too small to be able to seriously hinder the supply lines between Italy and Albania (between 28 October 1940 and 30 April 1941, Italian ships made 3,305 voyages across the Otranto straits, carrying 487,089 military personnel, including 22 field divisions, and 584,392 tons of supplies while losing overall only seven merchant ships and one escort ship). When Nazi Germany attacked Greece, the RHN was decimated by the Luftwaffe, suffered the loss of 25 ships within a few days during April 1941. It was then decided to shift the remaining fleet (one cruiser -the famous Georgios Averof-, six destroyers, five submarines, three torpedo boats and a number of auxiliary vessels) to Alexandria in Egypt. There the ships were repaired and equipped with modern anti-aircraft weapons.

For the remainder of the war, the RHN fought alongside the Allies from bases in the Middle East. As the war progressed, the number of Hellenic Royal Navy vessels increased after the concession of several destroyers and submarines by the British Royal Navy, reaching a peak of 44 ships and 8,500 men in early 1944.

The most notable aspects of the Hellenic Royal Navy's participation in World War II include the operations of the destroyer Vasilissa Olga which, until sunk in Leros on September 23, 1943, was the most successful Allied destroyer in the Mediterranean Sea; the participation of two destroyers in Operation Overlord; and the story of the destroyer Adrias, which while operating close to the coast of Kalymnos in October 1943 hit a mine, resulting in the loss of the vessel's prow, while blowing the two-gun forward turret over the bridge. After some minor repairs at Gümüşlük Bay in Turkey Adrias managed to return to Alexandria in a 400-mile trip, even though all the forepart of the ship, up to the bridge, was missing. Six Greek warships participated in the Sicilian landings and in the subsequent Italian campaign.

In April 1944, a mutiny arising from political causes among pro-EAM sailors broke out on five Greek warships berthed in Alexandria and spread to a number of other Greek naval and merchant vessels. Because the Greek Navy at the time had no Naval Infantry (with the then 32nd Infantry Regiment only reorganised as a naval infantry unit in 1967), it was put down by a task force made up of naval sailors, officers, cadets, and even officers from the army, who suffered 50 casualties.

== Modern Era 1950–1990 ==
After World War II, the Royal Hellenic Navy was significantly strengthened by the concession of British and Italian ships. The organisation also changed in line with modern naval doctrines of that era, leaving aside the old battleships after the entrance into NATO in 1952. At the beginning of the 1950s, US military aid formed the core of the country's armed forces. The Royal Hellenic Navy received the first Cannon-class (a.k.a. Bostwick) destroyers which took on the name Beasts (Θηρία), while withdrawing the British ones.

The next significant change was during the early 1970s, when Greece was the first Mediterranean naval force to order missile-equipped fast attack craft (La Combattante II) and the Type 209 submarines, whereas US military aid continued in the form of FRAM II type destroyers. In 1979, Hellenic Navy placed an order in the Netherlands for two modern Standard-class frigates (the Elli class). These were the first acquisitions of new main surface vessels, rather than the use of second-hand ships, in almost four decades.

== Present ==
The Hellenic Navy was significantly enhanced during the decade of the 1990s. The arrivals of the Hydra class (MEKO 200 HN) and more Standard-class frigates along with the orders for more missile corvettes, Poseidon-class (Type 209) submarines and naval helicopters allowed the retirement of the obsolete vessels. At the same time, Greece was the first Mediterranean country to receive guided missile destroyers, after the transfer of four Charles F. Adams-class destroyers from the US Navy in 1992. But all four have since been decommissioned, since their electronics and missiles were considered not able to stand in a modern battlefield.

The advance continued when Greece ordered Type 214 submarines that feature an air-independent propulsion system, Sikorsky S-70B-6/10 Aegean Hawk helicopters and Zubr-class hovercraft from Russia.

Plans include the modernization of Standard-class frigates with new electronics and radar systems, the modernization of Glaukos and Poseidon-class submarines with new sonars, electronics and air-independent propulsion engines (programs Neptune 1/2), while negotiations are being held with the US Navy for the acquisition of two Arleigh Burke-class destroyers.

== See also ==
- Byzantine navy

== Sources ==
- Fotakis, Zisis (2005). Greek naval strategy and policy, 1910–1919. London: Routledge. ISBN 978-0-415-35014-3.
- Fotakis, Zisis (2006). "The Kelly naval mission to Greece, May 1919–October 1921". Byzantine and Modern Greek Studies. 30 (2): 185–199. doi:10.1179/030701306X115832.
- Fotakis, Zisis (2011). "Greek naval policy and the Great Powers, 1931–40". Journal for Maritime Research. 13 (1): 55–67. doi:10.1080/21533369.2011.565993.
- Hall, Richard C. (2000). The Balkan Wars, 1912–1913: Prelude to the First World War. London: Routledge. ISBN 0-415-22946-4.
