= List of shipwrecks in 1959 =

The list of shipwrecks in 1959 includes ships sunk, foundered, grounded, or otherwise lost during 1959.

table of contents
1959
Jan	Feb	Mar	Apr
May	Jun	Jul	Aug
Sep	Oct	Nov	Dec
Unknown date

== January ==
=== 1 January ===
List of shipwrecks: 1 January 1959
Ship	State	Description
Valder	United States	The motor vessel sank in the North Pacific Ocean off Craig, Alaska.

=== 9 January ===
List of shipwrecks: 9 January 1959
Ship	State	Description
Freya	United Kingdom	The fisheries protection vessel foundered off Caithness with the loss of three of her twenty crew.

=== 14 January ===
List of shipwrecks: 14 January 1959
Ship	State	Description
Pelayo	United Kingdom	The cargo ship struck a jetty at Livorno, Italy and was holed. She subsequently sank, but all 32 crew and both passengers were rescued.

=== 18 January ===
List of shipwrecks: 18 January 1959
Ship	State	Description
Valiant Effort	United States	The Liberty ship was abandoned in the Mediterranean Sea. Seventeen of her 37 crew were rescued from their lifeboats by French Navy helicopters. The rest were rescued by the tug Belier (France). Valiant Effort subsequently came ashore near Ras el Djebel, Tunisia, and broke in two.

=== 23 January ===
List of shipwrecks: 23 January 1959
Ship	State	Description
Natone	Australia	The cargo ship ran aground and sank off Double Island Point, Queensland, Australia.

=== 25 January ===
List of shipwrecks: 25 January 1959
Ship	State	Description
Yandra	Australia	The coastal steamer ran aground and was wrecked at the mouth of Spencer Gulf in South Australia.

=== 27 January ===
List of shipwrecks: 27 January 1959
Ship	State	Description
Laura T Gabriella	Italy	The coaster sank in a storm off Antipaxos, Greece. All eight crew killed.
Adele Andolo	Italy	The coaster foundered 40 nautical miles (74 km) south of Malta. Five of her eleven crew were killed, six were rescued by the Admiralty tug Mediator (United Kingdom).

=== 30 January ===
List of shipwrecks: 30 January 1959
Ship	State	Description
Hans Hedtoft	Denmark	The cargo liner sank on her maiden voyage off Cape Farewell, Greenland with the loss of all 95 passengers and crew.

== February ==
=== 2 February ===
List of shipwrecks: 2 February 1959
Ship	State	Description
No. 63	Republic of China Navy	Chinese Civil War: The auxiliary gunboat was shelled and sunk by No. 565, No. 566, and No. 567 (all People's Liberation Army Navy). 11 crewmen killed, 12 taken as prisoners of war.

=== 4 February ===
List of shipwrecks: 4 February 1959
Ship	State	Description
Strathcoe	United Kingdom	The fishing trawler was wrecked on Santoo Head (near Rackwick), Hoy, Orkney, Scotland. The 14 crew were rescued by the Longhope Lifeboat and breeches buoy.

=== 5 February ===
List of shipwrecks: 5 February 1959
Ship	State	Description
Jens Bangrang	Denmark	The passenger ship ran aground north of Copenhagen. Three hundred passengers transferred ashore by tugs.

=== 7 February ===
List of shipwrecks: 7 February 1959
Ship	State	Description
Princesse Josephine Charlotte	Belgium	The ferry ran aground at Ostend, later refloated undamaged.
Pitho	Singapore	The tug collided with Takeshima Maru (Japan) in Singapore Harbour, capsized and sank with the loss of five of her nine crew.

=== 8 February ===
List of shipwrecks: 8 February 1959
Ship	State	Description
Juli	Iceland	The 193.2-foot (58.9 m) fishing vessel reported icing in heavy weather and sank approximately 180 miles northeast of Gander, Newfoundland. Lost with all 30 hands.

=== 9 February ===
List of shipwrecks: 9 February 1959
Ship	State	Description
Blue Wave	Canada	The 131-foot (40 m) fishing vessel reported icing in heavy weather with 80 MPH winds and -28 C temperature and sank approximately 62 miles southeast of Cape St. Mary's, Newfoundland. Lost with all 16 hands.

=== 13 February ===
List of shipwrecks: 13 February 1959
Ship	State	Description
Henry Foss	Canada	The tug struck a rock off Vancouver Island and sank with the loss of all five crew.

=== 17 February ===
List of shipwrecks: 17 February 1959
Ship	State	Description
Ocean Trade	United Kingdom	The cargo ship ran aground off Yokosuka, Japan. All 42 crew rescued.

=== 19 February ===
List of shipwrecks: 19 February 1959
Ship	State	Description
Marios II	Greece	The cargo ship sank at 38°35′N 24°21′E whilst under tow following a boiler explosion. She was on a voyage from Stratoni to Piraeus.
OPV Hermodur	Iceland	The lighthouse tender foundered off Reykjanes with the loss of all twelve crew.

=== 20 February ===
List of shipwrecks: 20 February 1959
Ship	State	Description
Llandaff	United Kingdom	The 12,501 grt freighter ran aground at Esbjerg. She was refloated 7 March 1959 and scrapped in September 1959.

=== 22 February ===
List of shipwrecks: 22 February 1959
Ship	State	Description
Irene C	United States	The 8-gross register ton, 30.2-foot (9.2 m) fishing vessel was destroyed by fire at Wrangell, Alaska.

=== 25 February ===
List of shipwrecks: 25 February 1959
Ship	State	Description
Ocean Trade	United Kingdom	The cargo ship sank off Yokosuka, Japan.

== March ==
=== 3 March ===
List of shipwrecks: 3 March 1959
Ship	State	Description
USS Cassia County	United States Navy	The decommissioned tank landing ship was sunk as a target.
Stellatus	Sweden	The cargo ship ran aground 2 1/2 nautical miles (4.6 km) south of Duncansby Head, Caithness, United Kingdom. All 40 crew were rescued. Stellatus was on a voyage from Turku, Finland to Ellesmere Port, Cheshire, United Kingdom. She broke in two on 10 March and was a total loss.

=== 14 March ===
List of shipwrecks: 14 March 1959
Ship	State	Description
Bluefin	United States	While her owner-operator was ashore, the 48-foot (14.6 m) seiner was destroyed by fire at Station Island (56°29′35″N 132°46′00″W) in Sumner Strait in the Alexander Archipelago in Southeast Alaska.

=== 17 March ===
List of shipwrecks: 17 March 1959
Ship	State	Description
Lisa C	Italy	The coastal tanker ran aground near Mazagan, Morocco. All crew rescued by American military helicopters from Sidi Slimane Air Base.

=== 21 March ===
List of shipwrecks: 21 March 1959
Ship	State	Description
Ruth	United States	The 32-foot (9.8 m) fishing vessel was destroyed by fire off Blank Island (55°16′20″N 131°38′30″W) in Nichols Passage in Southeast Alaska.

=== 23 March ===
List of shipwrecks: 23 March 1959
Ship	State	Description
Kholmogory	Soviet Union	The cargo ship collided with Bischofstein (West Germany) off Spiekeroog, Netherlands and sank. One of her 41 crew was killed, the 40 survivors were rescued by Bischofstein and landed at Bremerhaven, West Germany.

=== 26 March ===
List of shipwrecks: 26 March 1959
Ship	State	Description
Valchem	United States	The T2 tanker collided with the ocean liner Santa Rosa (United States) 20 nautical miles (37 km) east of Atlantic City, New Jersey. Four people were killed. Valchem was declared a constructive total loss and consequently scrapped.

=== 28 March ===
List of shipwrecks: 28 March 1959
Ship	State	Description
Antonin Dvorak	United States	The Liberty ship was driven ashore at Cape Hatteras, North Carolina whilst being towed from Wilmington, North Carolina to Baltimore, Maryland for scrapping. Refloated in April and completed the voyage.

=== 30 March ===
List of shipwrecks: 30 March 1959
Ship	State	Description
Point Reyes	United States	The 44-gross register ton, 57.2-foot (17.4 m) fishing vessel was destroyed by fire 0.125 nautical miles (0.232 km; 0.144 mi) southwest of Kane Island (57°19′25″N 135°40′00″W) in Salisbury Sound in Southeast Alaska.

== April ==
=== 12 April ===
List of shipwrecks: 12 April 1959
Ship	State	Description
Charlotte Ann	United States	The 15-gross register ton, 40.2-foot (12.3 m) fishing vessel was destroyed by fire in Belkofski Bay (55°05′N 162°09′W) on the south-central coast of Alaska.

=== 13 April ===
List of shipwrecks: 13 April 1959
Ship	State	Description
Alkaira		The cargo ship was destroyed at Ostend, Belgium, by an explosive charge planted by La Main Rouge.
Holdernith	United Kingdom	Ran aground off Burnham on Sea, Somerset. Refloated undamaged a week later.

=== 15 April ===
List of shipwrecks: 15 April 1959
Ship	State	Description
Spurn Lightship	United Kingdom	The lightship was driven ashore in the River Hull at Woodmansea, Yorkshire.

=== 19 April ===
List of shipwrecks: 19 April 1959
Ship	State	Description
Harborough	United Kingdom	The cargo ship struck the wreck of Kholmogory (Soviet Union) in the Weser Estuary and sank. All 42 crew rescued by the German pilot ship Weser (West Germany).

=== 26 April ===
List of shipwrecks: 26 April 1959
Ship	State	Description
Bygdov	Libya	The cargo ship ran aground at the entrance to Accra, Ghana. She was holed and sank.

=== 29 April ===
List of shipwrecks: 29 April 1959
Ship	State	Description
Prescott	Canada	The cargo ship collided with a bridge over the Beauharnois Canal at Valleyfield, Quebec and then ran aground. Refloated after fifteen hours.

== May ==
=== 5 May ===
List of shipwrecks: 5 May 1959
Ship	State	Description
Fortuna	United States	The 10-gross register ton, 36.1-foot (11.0 m) fishing vessel sank approximately 2 nautical miles (3.7 km; 2.3 mi) off the mouth of Burnett Inlet (56°04′N 132°28′W) in Southeast Alaska.
Nicolas Kairis	Greece	The Liberty ship ran aground at Kuchinoshima, Japan (30°30′N 129°52′E) and broke in two.

=== 8 May ===
List of shipwrecks: 8 May 1959
Ship	State	Description
Dandara	United Arab Republic	The passenger boat sank in the River Nile near Barrage Gardens, 16 miles (26 km) south of Cairo. At least 50 bodies had been recovered within two days of the accident and police estimated the death toll at 150.
Gugsier	West Germany	The tug collided with the tanker Kylix (Netherlands), which she was towing, and sank at Hamburg with the loss of one crewmember.

=== 9 May ===
List of shipwrecks: 9 May 1959
Ship	State	Description
Lassie	United States	The 21-gross register ton, 42-foot (12.8 m) fishing vessel sank in Stephens Passage near Midway Island (57°50′15″N 133°48′45″W) in the Alexander Archipelago in Southeast Alaska.
Wang Archer	United States	The Victory ship ran aground 3 nautical miles (5.6 km) west of Freeport, Bahamas. She was on a voyage from New Orleans, Louisiana to Bombay, India. She was refloated on 17 May and found to be severely damaged. Subsequently repaired and returned to service.

=== 11 May ===
List of shipwrecks: 11 May 1959
Ship	State	Description
P P	United States	The 8-gross register ton, 28-foot (8.5 m) fishing vessel was destroyed by fire approximately 200 yards (180 m) off Dog Point (57°10′10″N 135°25′20″W) in Sitka Sound in Southeast Alaska.

=== 13 May ===
List of shipwrecks: 13 May 1959
Ship	State	Description
USS Lyon County	United States Navy	The decommissioned LST-542-class tank landing ship was sunk as a torpedo target by the submarine USS Capitaine (United States Navy) off the coast of Washington.

=== 21 May ===
List of shipwrecks: 21 May 1959
Ship	State	Description
Channel Trader	United Kingdom	The coaster ran aground off Cap de la Hague, France.

=== 31 May ===
List of shipwrecks: 31 May 1959
Ship	State	Description
A R B 10	United States	The 39-gross register ton, 62.8-foot (19.1 m) fishing vessel sank in Lituya Bay in Southeast Alaska.

=== Unknown date ===
List of shipwrecks: Unknown date 1959
Ship	State	Description
Daibabe	Panama	The cargo ship sank east of Malta. All crew rescued by Uarda (Sweden).
USS LSSL-67	United States Navy	The LCS(L)-class landing craft was sunk as a target with bombs and rockets sometime in May.
Motomar	Argentina	The coaster sank off Argentina with the loss of fifteen of her eighteen crew.

== June ==
=== 9 June ===
List of shipwrecks: 9 June 1959
Ship	State	Description
Margaret Rose	India	The coaster capsized and sank off Dwarka, She was on a voyage from Bombay to Port Okha.

=== 14 June ===
List of shipwrecks: 14 June 1959
Ship	State	Description
Plouharnel	France	The Liberty ship caught fire off the Newport Rock. She was on a voyage from Le Havre to Djibouti, Djibouti. She put in to Suez, Egypt but subsequently resumed her voyage. The fire was extinguished on 26 June. She was declared a constructive total loss.

=== 15 June ===
List of shipwrecks: 15 June 1959
Ship	State	Description
Ocean Layer	United Kingdom	The cable ship caught fire in the Atlantic Ocean (48°26′N 19°03′W) and was abandoned by her crew. She was taken in tow by Wotan (West Germany), arriving at Falmouth, Cornwall on 21 June still on fire. Declared a constructive total loss and consequently scrapped.

=== 18 June ===
List of shipwrecks: 18 June 1959
Ship	State	Description
Springdale	United Kingdom	The cargo ship sank off the coast of Sweden. All seventeen crew survived unharmed.

=== 25 June ===
List of shipwrecks: 25 June 1959
Ship	State	Description
Monrovia	Liberia	During a voyage from Antwerp, Belgium, to either Chicago, Illinois, or Duluth, Minnesota (according to different sources) with a cargo of steel, the cargo ship collided in heavy fog with the steamer Royalton (United Kingdom) in Lake Huron and was abandoned by her crew. She sank in 140 feet (43 m) of water 11 nautical miles (20 km; 13 mi) off Thunder Bay Island, Michigan, United States the next day at 44.590278°N 82.553333°W.
Sabine	United States	The tanker collided with the T2 tanker Conastoga (United States) in Galveston Bay and was beached. Sabine was on a voyage from Houston, Texas to Tampa, Florida. She was refloated. Subsequently laid up, she was scrapped in 1961.

== July ==
=== 1 July ===
List of shipwrecks: 1 July 1959
Ship	State	Description
Kamishak	United States	The 12-gross register ton, 36.2-foot (11.0 m) fishing vessel sank at Cape Kumlik (56°39′N 157°27′W) on the south-central coast of Alaska.

=== 3 July ===
List of shipwrecks: 3 July 1959
Ship	State	Description
Ombrina	Italy	The tanker collided with a swing bridge and a yacht at Sète, France. She was holed and her cargo of avgas and petrol was set alight by a lighted gas cooker on board the yacht Bambula (United Kingdom), which caught fire and sank. The fire also spread to three other ships, Jacques Schiaffino and Tessala (both France) and Stilbe (Morocco). USS Fort Mandan (United States Navy) assisted firemen from Montpellier and Sète in fighting the fires. One of the four crew of Bambula and two of the crew of Ombrina were killed, with a further two crew from the latter ship seriously injured.
Rio Altro	Colombia	The cargo ship caught fire, exploded and sank in the Caribbean with the loss of up to five crew. Essen (West Germany) rescued 38 survivors and landed them at Cristóbal, Panama Canal Zone.

=== 6 July ===
List of shipwrecks: 6 July 1959
Ship	State	Description
Beaverbank	United Kingdom	The cargo ship ran aground at Fanning Island, Gilbert and Ellice Islands.

=== 12 July ===
List of shipwrecks: 12 July 1959
Ship	State	Description
St Ronan	United Kingdom	The coaster was in the English Channel when she was struck by the Liberty ship Mount Athos (Greece) and sliced in two. Both halves sank. Three of her ten crew were lost, with the survivors being rescued by Mount Athos and landed at Dover, Kent.

=== 17 July ===
List of shipwrecks: 17 July 1959
Ship	State	Description
ICGV Hermadur	Icelandic Coast Guard	The patrol vessel sank.

=== 18 July ===
List of shipwrecks: 18 July 1959
Ship	State	Description
Tyee	United States	The 16-gross register ton, 39-foot (11.9 m) fishing vessel was destroyed by fire at Anan Creek (56°10′50″N 131°53′05″W) in Ernest Sound in Southeast Alaska.

=== 28 July ===
List of shipwrecks: 28 July 1959
Ship	State	Description
Westbrook	United Kingdom	The tanker caught fire whilst laid up at Barry, Glamorgan. She was consequently scrapped.

=== 29 July ===
List of shipwrecks: 29 July 1959
Ship	State	Description
HMS Upstart	Royal Navy	The U-class submarine was sunk as a target off the Isle of Wight.
Rivergate	United Kingdom	The schooner capsized and sank off the Inner Dowsing Light Vessel ( Trinity House ). She was on a voyage from London to Goole, Yorkshire.

== August ==
=== 1 August ===
List of shipwrecks: 1 August 1959
Ship	State	Description
Queen Kathleen	Canada	The fishing vessel was wrecked on rocks in the Aleutian Islands west of Unimak Pass. The vessel Western Pioneer (United States) rescued her entire crew of eight.

=== 5 August ===
List of shipwrecks: 5 August 1959
Ship	State	Description
Porfico No. 1	United States	The 9-gross register ton, 31.1-foot (9.5 m) motor vessel was destroyed by fire at Ninilchik, Alaska.

=== 11 August ===
List of shipwrecks: 11 August 1959
Ship	State	Description
National Peace	United States	The T2 tanker ran aground on Kiltan Island, in the Laccadive Islands, India (11°33′N 73°01′E) and was abandoned. She was on a voyage from Bahrain to Manila, Philippines. She was refloated in March 1962 and towed in to Bombay, India, where she was declare a constructive total loss. She was consequently scrapped.

=== 18 August ===
List of shipwrecks: 18 August 1959
Ship	State	Description
Elinor D	United States	The 9-gross register ton, 29-foot (8.8 m) fishing vessel was destroyed at Ketchikan, Alaska, by a fire that began when she suffered an explosion as her owner turned the ignition key to start her gasoline engine.

=== 21 August ===
List of shipwrecks: 21 August 1959
Ship	State	Description
Micho	United States	The 21-gross register ton, 34.4-foot (10.5 m) cargo vessel was destroyed by fire in Smeaton Bay (55°19′N 130°54′W) in Southeast Alaska.
Pilar II	Philippines	The passenger ship foundered 300 nautical miles (560 km) south of Palawan. There were eleven survivors from the 100 people on board.

=== 23 August ===
List of shipwrecks: 23 August 1959
Ship	State	Description
Naranco	Spain	The coaster collided with Goldstone (Panama) in the English Channel off Dungeness, Kent and sank with the loss of one of her 22 crew.
Staxton Wyke	United Kingdom	The trawler was in collision with Dalhanna (United Kingdom) and sank 10 nautical miles (19 km) off Flamborough Head, Yorkshire with the loss of five of her 21 crew. The sixteen survivors were rescued by Dalhanna.

=== 24 August ===
List of shipwrecks: 24 August 1959
Ship	State	Description
Gerontas	Panama	The Liberty ship ran aground at Gdynia, Poland. She was on a voyage from Vitoria to Gdynia. She was later refloated but was declared a constructive total loss and scrapped.

=== 26 August ===
List of shipwrecks: 26 August 1959
Ship	State	Description
Newington	Canada	The tugboat sank while laid up at Burrard Inlet, British Columbia.
Wonder Girl	United States	The 16-gross register ton, 35-foot (10.7 m) fishing vessel sank near False Pass, Alaska.

=== 30 August ===
List of shipwrecks: 30 August 1959
Ship	State	Description
Glen Usk	United Kingdom	The passenger ship ran aground in the River Avon. Refloated the next day.

=== 31 August ===
List of shipwrecks: 31 August 1959
Ship	State	Description
Comet	United States	The 41-gross register ton, 56-foot (17.1 m) motor cargo vessel was wrecked near Kodiak, Alaska.

=== Unknown date ===
List of shipwrecks: Unknown date August 1959
Ship	State	Description
Hilda	United States	The 10-ton, 36.5-foot (11.1 m) fishing vessel near Saint John Harbor (56°27′00″N 132°57′30″W) on Zarembo Island in the Alexander Archipelago in Southeast Alaska.

== September ==
=== 4 September ===
List of shipwrecks: 4 September 1959
Ship	State	Description
Spica	Sweden	The cargo ship sank off Le Havre, France. Refloated on 6 September.

=== 7 September ===
List of shipwrecks: 7 September 1959
Ship	State	Description
Empire Oberon	United Kingdom	The tug sank at Akra, India. The wreck was dispersed by explosives in October.

=== 8 September ===
List of shipwrecks: 8 September 1959
Ship	State	Description
Putco-2	United States	The 90-gross register ton, 70.1-foot (21.4 m) barge was wrecked near Dutch Harbor, Alaska.

=== 10 September ===
List of shipwrecks: 10 September 1959
Ship	State	Description
Sukie	United States	The 20-gross register ton, 40-foot (12.2 m) fishing vessel was destroyed by fire in the Duncan Canal in Southeast Alaska.

=== 14 September ===
List of shipwrecks: 14 September 1959
Ship	State	Description
Jezebel	United Kingdom	The schooner sank off Penmon Point, Beaumaris. All six people on board rescued.

=== 27 September ===
List of shipwrecks: 27 September 1959
Ship	State	Description
Changsha	Australia	Typhoon Vera: The passenger ship was driven aground at Yokkaichi, Japan.
Tjitjalengka	Netherlands	Typhoon Vera: The passenger ship was driven aground near Nagoya, Japan.

=== Unknown date ===
List of shipwrecks: Unknown date in September 1959
Ship	State	Description
M-252	Soviet Navy	The submarine ran aground in the Tatar Strait with the loss of several lives. She was later refloated.

== October ==
=== 4 October ===
List of shipwrecks: 4 October 1959
Ship	State	Description
NRP Comandante Celestino Silva	Portuguese Navy	The air-sea rescue vessel foundered between Madeira and Lisbon. Crew rescued by the corvette NRP Santa Maria (Portuguese Navy).

=== 18 October ===
List of shipwrecks: 18 October 1959
Ship	State	Description
Deniz	Turkey	The ship was boarded by crew from HMS Burnaston (Royal Navy) off Cyprus and ammunition was discovered on board. Three crew were arrested, but the vessel was scuttled.

=== 22 October ===
List of shipwrecks: 22 October 1959
Ship	State	Description
Ruth Ann	United States	The 135-gross register ton, 107.3-foot (32.7 m) fishing vessel sank at Woronkofski Island in the Alexander Archipelago in Southeast Alaska.

=== 23 October ===
List of shipwrecks: 23 October 1959
Ship	State	Description
Lipari	United States	The Liberty ship ran aground off Grays Harbor, Washington. She was on a voyage from Calcutta, India to Seattle, Washington. She was refloated on 30 October and towed in to Portland, Oregon in a severely damaged condition. Consequently scrapped.

=== 27 October ===
List of shipwrecks: 27 October 1958
Ship	State	Description
Hindlea	United Kingdom	The coaster was driven ashore in Moelfre Bay and was abandoned by her crew. She was looted by the local inhabitants and was declared a total loss.

=== 28 October ===
List of shipwrecks: 28 October 1958
Ship	State	Description
Rayland	United States	The 34-ton motor vessel was destroyed by fire in Valdez Arm (60°53′N 146°54′W) on the south-central coast of Alaska.

=== Unknown date ===
List of shipwrecks: Unknown date 1959
Ship	State	Description
Hindlea	United Kingdom	The coaster was driven ashore and wrecked. Her crew were rescued by the HolyHead Lifeboat.

== November ==
=== 13 November ===
List of shipwrecks: 13 November 1959
Ship	State	Description
Lough Fisher	United Kingdom	The coaster ran aground at the southern tip of Öland, Sweden.

=== 16 November ===
List of shipwrecks: 23 November 1959
Ship	State	Description
HDMS Hjælperen	Royal Danish Navy	The torpedo boat tender collided with the cargo ship Ceres (Finland) at Copenhagen and was severely damaged.

=== 23 November ===
List of shipwrecks: 23 November 1959
Ship	State	Description
President Reiz	United Kingdom	The tanker ran aground at Oslo, Norway and was holed.
Tanar	Turkey	The cargo ship was in collision with Kharkov (Soviet Union) and sank in the North Sea. All crew rescued by Kharkov. Kharkov was arrested on arrival at Bremen, West Germany.
Wansbeck	United Kingdom	The coaster caught fire at Ghent, Belgium. One crewmember was killed.

=== 24 November ===
List of shipwrecks: 24 November 1959
Ship	State	Description
Holmglen	New Zealand	The cargo ship sank off Timaru with the loss of 15 lives.

=== 27 October ===
List of shipwrecks: 27 October 1959
Ship	State	Description
Hindlea	United Kingdom	The coaster was driven ashore in Moelfre Bay, Anglesey and broke in two, a total loss.

=== 30 November ===
List of shipwrecks: 30 November 1959
Ship	State	Description
Braemar Castle	United Kingdom	The ocean liner was driven ashore at Gibraltar in a gale. Refloated the next day.

=== Unknown date ===
List of shipwrecks: Unknown date 1959
Ship	State	Description
Parks No. 3	United States	A storm destroyed the 7-gross register ton, 29.5-foot (9.0 m) fishing vessel off Tonki Cape (58°21′N 151°59′W) on Afognak Island in the Kodiak Archipelago.

== December ==
=== 1 December ===
List of shipwrecks: 1 December 1959
Ship	State	Description
Tillikum	United States	The 26-gross register ton, 47-foot (14.3 m) fishing vessel sank near Dundas Island, British Columbia, Canada.

=== 6 December ===
List of shipwrecks: 6 December 1959
Ship	State	Description
George Robb	United Kingdom	The fishing vessel ran aground at Duncansby Head, Scotland, with the loss of all 12 crew.

=== 7 December ===
List of shipwrecks: 7 December 1959
Ship	State	Description
Servus	United Kingdom	The motor vessel ran aground below Dunbeath Castle, Scotland. All crew rescued by lifeboat.

=== 8 December ===
List of shipwrecks: 8 December 1959
Ship	State	Description
RNLB Mona (ON 775)	Royal National Lifeboat Institution	The lifeboat capsized out of Broughty Ferry, Scotland, with the loss of all eight crew.

=== 9 December ===
List of shipwrecks: 9 December 1959
Ship	State	Description
Elfrida	Norway	The cargo ship sprang a leak and sank off Stavanger. She was on a voyage from Arkhangelsk, Soviet Union to a Danish port.

=== 13 December ===
List of shipwrecks: 13 December 1959
Ship	State	Description
Argus	United States	The 30-gross register ton, 41.6-foot (12.7 m) fishing vessel was wrecked on Tilson Island (57°03′N 135°20′W) in Southeast Alaska approximately four nautical miles (7.4 km; 4.6 mi) west of Sitka, Alaska.
Eastern Lucky	Panama	The steamer sprang a leak and sank off Formosa. All 43 crew rescued by the steamer Tyne Breeze (Hong Kong).

=== 14 December ===
List of shipwrecks: 14 December 1959
Ship	State	Description
HMS Cleveland	Royal Navy	The wreck of the Hunt-class destroyer, stranded at Llangennith, Glamorgan, Wales, since 28 June 1957, was blown up after being stripped.
Red Falcon	United Kingdom	The 161.3-foot (49.2 m), 449-ton trawler foundered off Skerryvore in rough weather with winds gusting to 90 miles per hour (140 km/h). Lost with all 19 hands.

=== 16 December ===
List of shipwrecks: 16 December 1959
Ship	State	Description
Lew-Al	United States	The 17-gross register ton, 36.3-foot (11.1 m) fishing vessel was wrecked in the lower part of Cook Inlet on the south-central coast of Alaska.
Mount Vernon	United States	The T2 tanker arrived at Antwerp, Belgium from Galveston, Texas severely damaged by weather and with damage to her engines. Repairs declared uneconomic, she was scrapped.

=== 17 December ===
List of shipwrecks: 17 December 1959
Ship	State	Description
Moelv	Norway	The floating power station, a converted T2 tanker, suffered a turbine explosion at Gothenburg, Sweden. She was declared a constructive total loss and consequently scrapped.

=== 20 December ===
List of shipwrecks: 20 December 1959
Ship	State	Description
Jamin I	Belgium	The steamer ran aground 2 nautical miles (3.7 km) west of the Harmaja Lighthouse, Helsinki. Refloated 5 January 1960, subsequently scrapped.

=== 25 December ===
List of shipwrecks: 25 December 1959
Ship	State	Description
Rosa Vlassi	Greece	The collier capsized and sank between Laurium and Makronisi. She was on a voyage from Stratoni to Piraeus.

=== 30 December ===
List of shipwrecks: 30 December 1959
Ship	State	Description
Valley Forge	United States	The Liberty ship ran aground off Mapor Island, Singapore, and broke in two, a total loss.

== Unknown date ==
List of shipwrecks: Unknown date 1959
Ship	State	Description
Cape Corso	United Kingdom	The Ocean ship collided with another vessel and ran aground. She was consequently scrapped.
USS Esmeraldo County	United States Navy	The decommissioned LST-542-class tank landing ship was sunk as a target.
ROKS Kang Wha	Republic of Korea Navy	The YMS-1-class coastal minesweeper was sunk.
Kimball	United States	The 20-gross register ton, 37.7-foot (11.5 m) motor cargo vessel was destroyed by fire in Knudsen Cove (55°28′30″N 131°48′00″W) in Southeast Alaska.
Kwinana	Australia	The wreck of Kwinana, ca. 1960 The hulk of the passenger-cargo ship, aground 3 miles (4.8 km) north of Rockingham, Western Australia, since 29 May 1922 and partly destroyed by explosive charges on 2 May 1941, was cut down to water level.
Paramount	United States	The 42-gross register ton, 58.6-foot (17.9 m) fishing vessel sank in Frederick Sound in the Alexander Archipelago in Southeast Alaska.
"Peggy"	United Kingdom	The trawler stranded in fog near Fleetwood Pier 40 yards from the Prominade, Fleetwood sometime in December. Engine and other equipment salvaged.
Roosevelt II	United States	The 108-foot (33 m), 126-gross register ton ferry was scuttled in Lake Champlain sometime in 1959.
