= Greek ship Rodos =

At least two ships of the Hellenic Navy have borne the name Rodos (Greek: Ρόδος), after the Greek island of Rhodes:

- Greek landing ship Rodos (L157), an LST-1-class tank landing ship launched in 1942 as USS LST-391 and renamed USS Bowman County in 1955. She was transferred to Greece in 1960 and renamed Rodos. She was stricken in 1997.
- Greek landing ship Rodos (L177). a Jason-class tank landing ship commissioned in 2000.
