= Greek ship Lemnos =

Three ships of the Hellenic Navy have borne the name Lemnos or Limnos (Greek: Λήμνος), named after the island of Lemnos and the First Balkan War Battle of Lemnos:

- Greek battleship Lemnos (1914–1932), a Mississippi-class pre-dreadnought battleship
- Greek landing ship Lemnos (L158) (1943–1977), an LST1-class landing ship
- Greek frigate Limnos (1982–present), a Kortenaer/Elli-class frigate
