= Greek ship Spetsai =

Five ships of the Hellenic Navy have borne the name Spetsai (Σπέτσαι), named after the island of Spetses, which played a major role in the Greek War of Independence:

- Spetsai (1828–1831), a sail corvette bought from Laskarina Bouboulina, destroyed in 1831 at Poros during a rebellion against Governor Ioannis Kapodistrias
- Spetsai (1881–1889), a British-built steam gunboat, renamed to Aktion
- Spetsai (1890–1920), a French-built ironclad warship
- Spetsai (1933–1946), a Dardo-class destroyer
- Spetsai (1998–present), a Hydra-class (MEKO 200-type) frigate
