= Greek steamer Maximilianos =

Maximilianos
History

Greece
- Builder: Poros Naval Shipyard
- Launched: 1837

General characteristics
- Tonnage: 180 tons

Maximilianos was the first Greek-built steamship, completed in 1837 at the Poros Naval Shipyard. It was named after the then Crown Prince and future King Maximilian II of Bavaria, the elder brother of Greece's first king, Otto. It was an unarmed, 180-ton steamer used for auxiliary naval duties and mail service. The Poros Naval Shipyard undertook construction of a large number of ships for the Greek Navy until the 1880s, when Greece's main naval base was transferred to Salamis.

== External link ==
- L.S. Skartsis, "Modern Greece's Machines: A Comprehensive Guide to Greek Vehicle & Machine Manufacturers (1700 to Present)" (2026) ISBN 978-618-00-6734-7 (eBook)
