= USS Brown (DD-546) =

Fletcher-class destroyer

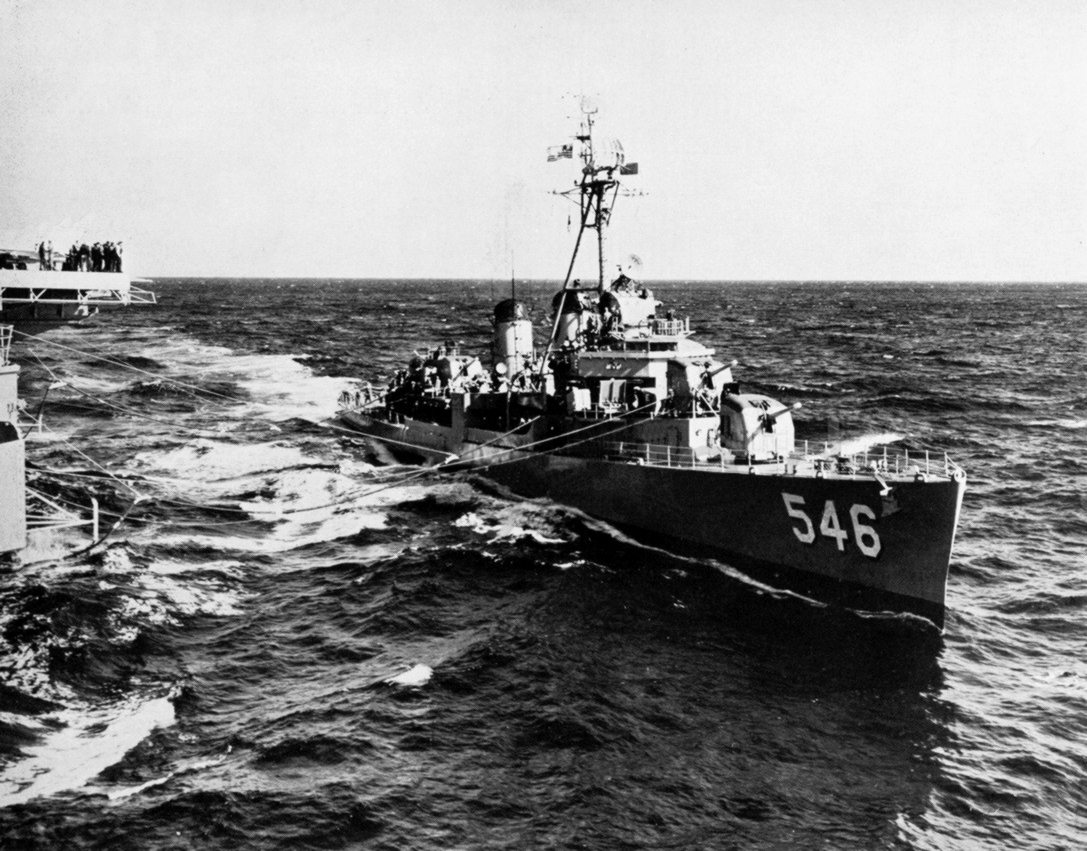
- USS Brown in 1958

History

United States
- Name: USS Brown
- Namesake: George Brown
- Builder: Bethlehem Shipbuilding, San Pedro, California
- Laid down: 27 June 1942
- Launched: 21 February 1943
- Sponsored by: Mrs. Claude O. Kell
- Commissioned: 10 July 1943
- Decommissioned: 1 August 1946
- Recommissioned: 27 October 1950
- Decommissioned: 9 February 1962
- Stricken: 1 September 1975
- Identification: DD-546
- Fate: Transferred to Hellenic Navy, 27 September 1962

Greece
- Name: Navarinon
- Acquired: 27 September 1962
- Stricken: 1981
- Identification: D63
- Fate: Scrapped

General characteristics
- Class & type: Fletcher-class destroyer
- Displacement: 2,050 tons
- Length: 376 ft 6 in (114.76 m)
- Beam: 39 ft 8 in (12.09 m)
- Draft: 17 ft 9 in (5.41 m)
- Propulsion: 60,000 shp (45,000 kW); 2 propellers
- Speed: 35 kn (65 km/h; 40 mph)
- Range: 6,500 nmi (12,000 km; 7,500 mi) at 15 kn (28 km/h; 17 mph)
- Complement: 329
- Armament: 5 × single Mk 12 5 in (127 mm)/38 guns; 5 × twin 40 mm (1.6 in) Bofors AA guns; 7 × single 20 mm (0.8 in) Oerlikon AA guns; 2 × quintuple 21 in (533 mm) torpedo tubes; 6 × single depth charge throwers; 2 × depth charge racks

USS Brown (DD-546) was a Fletcher-class destroyer of the United States Navy, named for George Brown, a seaman on the crew of USS Intrepid during the raid that destroyed the captured USS Philadelphia in Tripoli harbor during the First Barbary War. Entering service in 1943 during World War II, the ship saw active service until 1962 when she was decommissioned and sold to Greece. Renamed Navarinon, the destroyer was active until 1981 when she was sold for scrap.

== Construction and career ==
Brown was launched on 21 February 1943 by Bethlehem Steel Co. San Pedro, California, sponsored by Mrs. Claude O. Kell, wife of Captain Kell. The ship was commissioned on 10 July 1943.

On 10 November 1943 Brown departed Pearl Harbor in company with Task Force 50 (TF 50) en route to the forward area. During Brown's very active service in the Pacific, she screened carriers during

- the Gilbert Islands invasion (21 November – 6 December 1943);
- Kavieng, New Ireland raids (25 December 1943 – 4 January 1944),
- Marshall Islands raids (29 January – 7 February),
- Truk raid (16–17 February);
- Palau-Yap-Woleai raids (30 March – 2 April);
- assault and capture of Hollandia, New Guinea (21–28 April);
- Truk raid (29 April);
- bombardment of Satawan (30 April);
- Ponape raids (1 May);
- Marcus Island raid (19–20 May);
- Wake Island raid (23 May);
- strikes in support of the assault on Saipan (1–26 June);
- Battle of the Philippine Sea, during which she rescued four American pilots (19–20 June),
- bombardment of Iwo Jima (4 July),
- assaults on Guam and on Tinian (12 July – 6 August);
- Yap raids (26–28 July);
- Chichi Jima raids (4–5 August);
- raids on Palau, Mindanao, Talaud, and Morotai,
- supporting the capture of the Southern Palaus and Ulithi (6–15 September);
- raids against Luzon and the Visayas (21–24 September);
- raids on Okinawa, Formosa, and Luzon (10–19 October);
- Battle for Leyte Gulf (26 October);
- raids on Manila and the Visayas (6 November),
- and raids against northern and central Philippines in support of the seizing of Mindoro Island (15–16 December).

Task Force 88 was caught in a typhoon (17–18 December), and strikes against Luzon were canceled in order to search for survivors of three missing destroyers. On 21 December Brown recovered 18 survivors of the destroyer Hull and six survivors of the destroyer Monaghan. Brown then proceeded to Ulithi and received orders to return to Seattle, Washington, for overhaul. Repairs completed on 1 March 1945, she was ready for sea. After a brief stop at Pearl Harbor, Brown headed westward to take part in the Okinawa operation (1 April–30 June 1945), during which she was awarded the Navy Unit Commendation for her service as a radar picket ship; 3d Fleet operations against Japan (30 June–15 July); and the minesweeping operations southwest of Okinawa.

With the cessation of hostilities Brown served with the occupation forces in Japan until 28 October 1945. She then departed for Naval Station San Diego, arriving 17 November 1945. She went out of commission in reserve 1 August 1946 at San Diego.

=== 1950–1962 ===
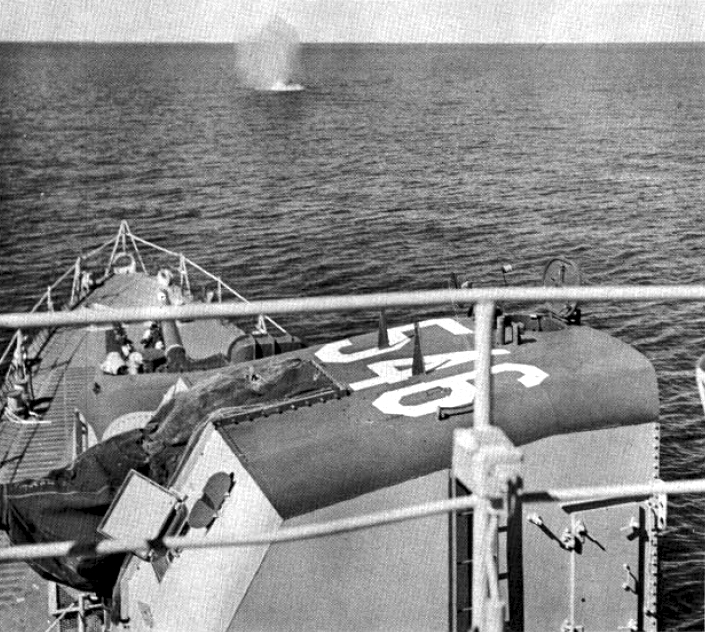
Brown under fire from North Korean shore batteries, 1951.

Brown was recommissioned 27 October 1950. She conducted intensive shakedown operations off the west coast and then reported to Commander, Naval Forces, Far East, in March 1951. From March until September she operated with Task Forces 77 and 95 and participated in the siege of Wonsan Harbor on two occasions. Brown returned to California in October 1951. Her next Western Pacific tour was between July 1952 and January 1953, during which time she operated on the Formosan Patrol. She made four further Far Eastern tours and operated along the West Coast.

Brown was decommissioned 9 February 1962.

=== Greek service ===
The ship was transferred to Greece on 27 September 1962. She served in the Greek Navy as Navarinon (D63).

In 1981, the ship was stricken and scrapped.

== Awards ==
Brown received the Navy Unit Commendation, for services rendered during the Okinawa operation, in addition to 13 battle stars for her World War II service. She was awarded two battle stars for her Korean War service.
