= USS Connole =

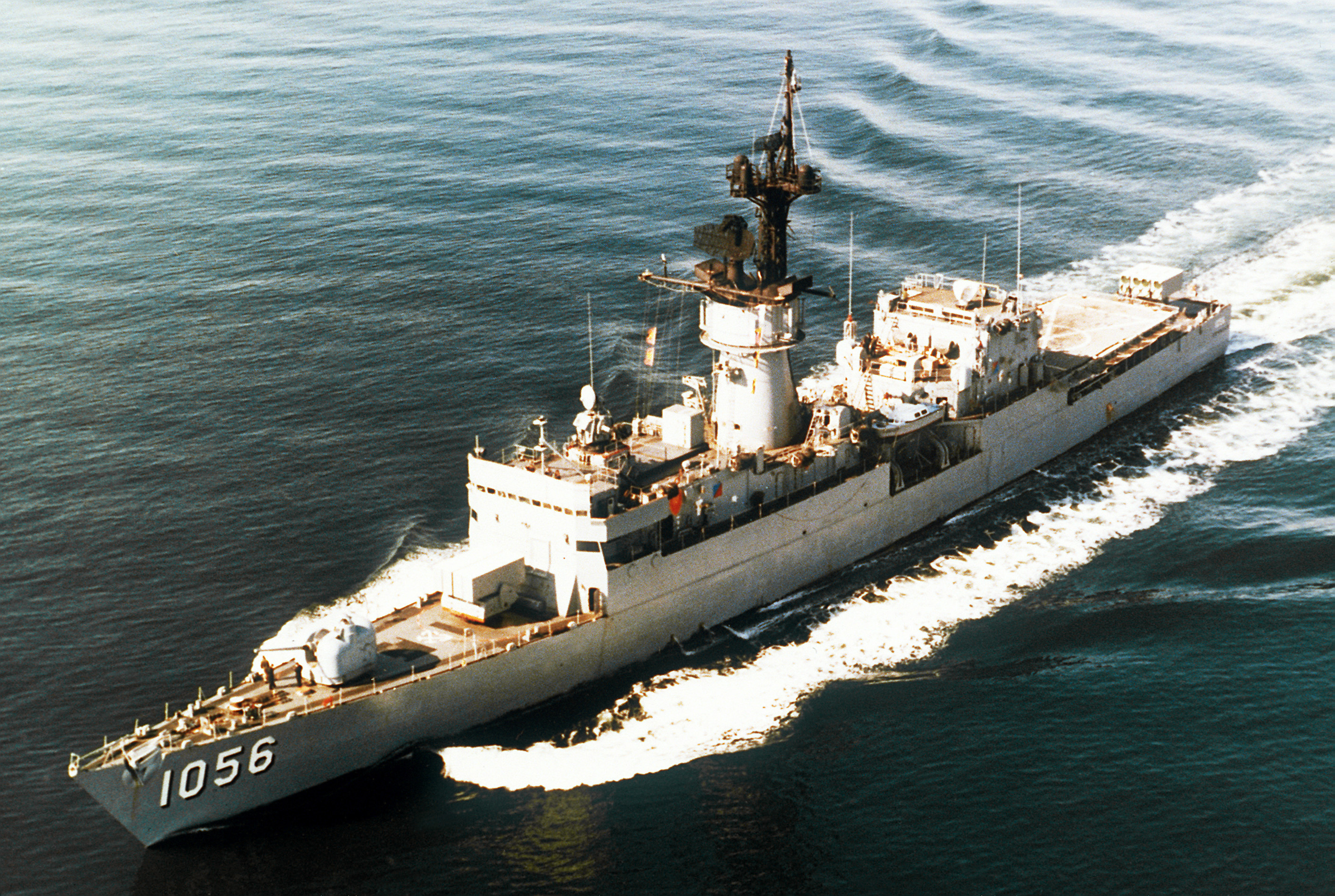
- USS Connole (FF-1056) underway

History

United States
- Name: Connole
- Namesake: David R. Connole
- Ordered: 22 July 1964
- Builder: Avondale Shipyard, Westwego, Louisiana
- Yard number: 1070
- Laid down: 23 March 1967
- Launched: 20 July 1968
- Acquired: 22 August 1969
- Commissioned: 30 August 1969
- Identification: DE-1056
- Reclassified: FF-1056, 1 July 1975
- Decommissioned: 30 August 1992
- Stricken: 11 January 1995
- Motto: Exempla Suorum Durant; The Example of our Ancestors Endures
- Fate: Transferred to Greece, 1992

Greece
- Name: Ipiros
- Namesake: Epirus
- Acquired: 1992
- Decommissioned: 2003
- Identification: F456
- Fate: Sunk as target, 2006

General characteristics
- Class & type: Knox-class frigate
- Displacement: 3,278 tons (4,245 full load)
- Length: 438 ft (134 m)
- Beam: 46 ft 9 in (14.25 m)
- Draft: 24 ft 9 in (7.6 m)
- Propulsion: 2 × Babcock & Wilcox 1200psi boilers; 1 Westinghouse geared turbine; 1 shaft, 35,000 shp (26,000 kW)
- Speed: over 27 knots (50 km/h)
- Endurance: 4,500 nautical miles @ 20 knots (8,300 km @ 37 km/h)
- Complement: 18 officers, 267 enlisted
- Sensors & processing systems: AN/SPS-40 Air Search Radar; AN/SPS-67 Surface Search Radar; AN/SQS-26 Sonar; AN/SQR-18 Towed array sonar system; Mk68 Gun Fire Control System
- Electronic warfare & decoys: AN/SLQ-32 Electronics Warfare System
- Armament: one Mk-16 8 cell missile launcher for RUR-5 ASROC and Harpoon missiles; one Mk-42 5-inch/54 caliber gun; Mark 46 torpedoes from four single tube launchers); one Mk-25 BPDMS launcher for Sea Sparrow missiles, later replaced by Phalanx CIWS
- Aircraft carried: one SH-2 Seasprite (LAMPS I) helicopter

USS Connole (FF-1056) was a Knox-class frigate, named for Commander David R. Connole, Captain of USS Trigger when the submarine was lost in battle in March 1945.

== Design and description ==
The Knox-class design was derived from the Brooke-class frigate modified to extend range and without a long-range missile system. The ships had an overall length of 438 feet (133.5 m), a beam of 47 feet (14.3 m) and a draft of 25 feet (7.6 m). They displaced 4,066 long tons (4,131 t) at full load. Their crew consisted of 13 officers and 211 enlisted men.

The ships were equipped with one Westinghouse geared steam turbine that drove the single propeller shaft. The turbine was designed to produce 35,000 shaft horsepower (26,000 kW), using steam provided by 2 C-E boilers, to reach the designed speed of 27 knots (50 km/h; 31 mph). The Knox class had a range of 4,500 nautical miles (8,300 km; 5,200 mi) at a speed of 20 knots (37 km/h; 23 mph).

The Knox-class ships were armed with a 5"/54 caliber Mark 42 gun forward and a single 3-inch/50-caliber gun aft. They mounted an eight-round ASROC launcher between the 5-inch (127 mm) gun and the bridge. Close-range anti-submarine defense was provided by two twin 12.75-inch (324 mm) Mk 32 torpedo tubes. The ships were equipped with a torpedo-carrying DASH drone helicopter; its telescoping hangar and landing pad were positioned amidships aft of the mack. Beginning in the 1970s, the DASH was replaced by a SH-2 Seasprite LAMPS I helicopter and the hangar and landing deck were accordingly enlarged. Most ships also had the 3-inch (76 mm) gun replaced by an eight-cell BPDMS missile launcher in the early 1970s.

== Construction and career ==
Connole was constructed for the United States Navy by Avondale Shipyard, Westwego, Louisiana, laid down 23 March 1967, launched 20 July 1968 and delivered 22 August 1969. She was commissioned 30 August 1969, served as a test bed for some of the Navy's most advanced sonars, decommissioned 30 August 1992 and struck 11 January 1995. Connole was transferred to Greece as Ipiros (F456), named after the region of Epirus. The ship was decommissioned by Greece in 2003.
