= Greek ship Ermis =

Hellenic Navy ship

- HS Ermis, A-373

History

Trawler
- Name: Hoheweg
- Laid down: 1960
- Launched: 1961
- Fate: Sold to the German Navy, 1972

History

Germany
- Name: Oker, A-53
- Acquired: 1972
- Commissioned: 1972
- Decommissioned: 1988
- Fate: Transferred to Greece

History

Greece
- Name: Hermes
- Acquired: 1988-02-12
- Decommissioned: 2002
- Fate: Sold for scrap

General characteristics
- Displacement: 1,497 tons
- Length: 72.5 m (238 ft)
- Beam: 10.5 m (34 ft)
- Draft: 4.9 m (16 ft)
- Propulsion: Diesel-electric, 1 diesel engine, 1 shaft, 1,800 bhp
- Speed: 15 knots (28 km/h; 17 mph)
- Complement: 90

Ermis (Α-373) (Greek: ΠΗΠ Ερμής, "Hermes") was an auxiliary ship of the Hellenic Navy, which served from 1988 to 2002 as an electronic surveillance ship.

She started her career as the 1500 tn trawler Hoheweg. In 1961 she was converted to an electronic surveillance ship by the German Navy and named Oker (A-53). In German Navy service she was classified as a Flottendienstboot (fleet service vessel), in Class 422.

In 1988 she was decommissioned and transferred to the Hellenic Navy, where she served under Hellenic Destroyers Command as a signals intelligence gathering ship. In 2002 she was decommissioned and sold for scrap.
