= CS Ocean Layer =

German then British cable ship

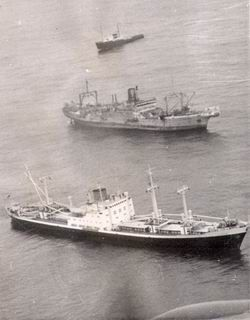
- Ocean Layer with Flavia and Wotan, June 1959

History

United Kingdom
- Name: Empire Frome (1945–1955); Ocean Layer (1955–1959)
- Owner: Ministry of War Transport (1945); Ministry of Transport (1945–1953); Submarine Cables Ltd (1953–1959)
- Operator: George Nesbit & Co (1948–1953); Submarine Cables Ltd (1953–1959)
- Builder: Flensburger Schiffbau-Gesellschaft
- Yard number: 508
- Laid down: 1945
- Launched: 1945
- Completed: 1948
- In service: 1948
- Out of service: 15 June 1959
- Identification: United Kingdom Official Number 181837
- Fate: Caught fire and damaged. Declared a constructive total loss and consequently scrapped

General characteristics
- Class & type: Cargo ship (1945–1953); Cable ship (1953–1959)
- Tonnage: 2,774 GRT, 1,518 NRT, 5,450 DWT (1945–53); 4,534 GRT (1953–1959), 5,360 DWT (1953–1959)
- Length: 109.55 m (359 ft 5 in) overall, 109.55 m (359 ft 5 in) between perpendiculars (1945–53); 115.21 m (378 ft 0 in) overall (1953–1959)
- Beam: 15.44 m (50 ft 8 in)
- Depth: 5.64 m (18 ft 6 in) (1945–1953), 6.48 m (21 ft 3 in) (1953–1959)
- Installed power: Lenz steam engine, exhaust turbine
- Propulsion: Single screw propeller
- Speed: 11 knots (20 km/h)
- Crew: 83 (Ocean Layer)

Location where Ocean Layer caught fire

Ocean Layer was a 2,773 GRT cable ship built as a cargo ship in 1945 by Flensburger Schiffbau-Gesellschaft, Flensburg, Germany. She was seized in May 1945 before launching and claimed as a war prize. Named Empire Frome, she was allocated to the Ministry of War Transport (MoWT). The ship was completed in 1948. She was sold and converted to a cable ship in 1953, operating until 1959 when she caught fire at sea. Although she safely reached port, she was declared a constructive total loss and scrapped.

== Description ==
As built, the ship was 109.55 m (359 ft 5 in) overall, 109.55 m (359 ft 5 in) between perpendiculars, with a beam of 50 ft 8 in (15.44 m). She had a depth of 18 ft 6 in (5.64 m). As built, she was assessed at 2,774 GRT, 5,450 DWT.

The ship was propelled by a 1,800 ihp Lenz engine driving an exhaust turbine. The engine was built by Werkspoor, Amsterdam, North Holland, Netherlands. Steam was supplied by three Capus-type boilers. It drove a single screw propeller. The engine could propel the ship at a speed of 11 knots (20 km/h).

== History ==
The ship was built by Flensburger Schiffbau-Gesellschaft as yard number 508. Laid down in 1945, she was seized in May 1945 before she had been launched. Allocated to the Ministry of War Transport, which became the Ministry of Transport that year, she was completed in 1948 as Empire Frome. Although not officially yet declared a prize of war, she was advertised for sale in January 1948 "as lying in the River Tyne". She was placed under the management of George Nesbit & Co. Ltd., Glasgow. Empire Frome was allocated the United Kingdom Official Number 181837.

In December 1951, Empire Frome issued an SOS in the Atlantic Ocean whilst on a voyage from Bridgewater, Nova Scotia, Canada, to Hull, Yorkshire. She reached Hull on 27 December, having suffered damage to her derricks and with lifeboats lost or damaged. She was advertised for sale in April 1953, and again in September.

Empire Frome was purchased by Submarine Cables Ltd. In January 1954, Submarine Cables Ltd applied to the Ministry of Transport and Civil Aviation to have the ship's name changed in accordance with the Merchant Shipping Act 1894 (57 & 58 Vict. c. 60). In March, it was reported that Empire Frome had been purchased by Submarine Cables Ltd and was to be converted to a cable ship. Work was estimated to take about a year to complete. The rebuild, by R S Hayes at Pembroke Dock, took fifteen months at a cost of £1 million, including purchase. She was renamed Ocean Layer on 29 September 1955. Following rebuilding, she was 115.21 m (378 ft 0 in) long overall with a depth of 6.48 m (21 ft 3 in). She was assessed at 4,534 GRT, 5,360 DWT. She could carry 3,700 tons of submarine cable, enough for 1,000 to 2,000 nautical miles (1,900 to 3,700 km) depending on size. Cable was carried in four tanks, of 42 feet (13 m), 46 feet (14 m), 43 feet 6 inches (13.26 m) and 29 feet (8.8 m) diameter. Her complement was 83. Ocean Layer was then the second-largest cable ship in the world.

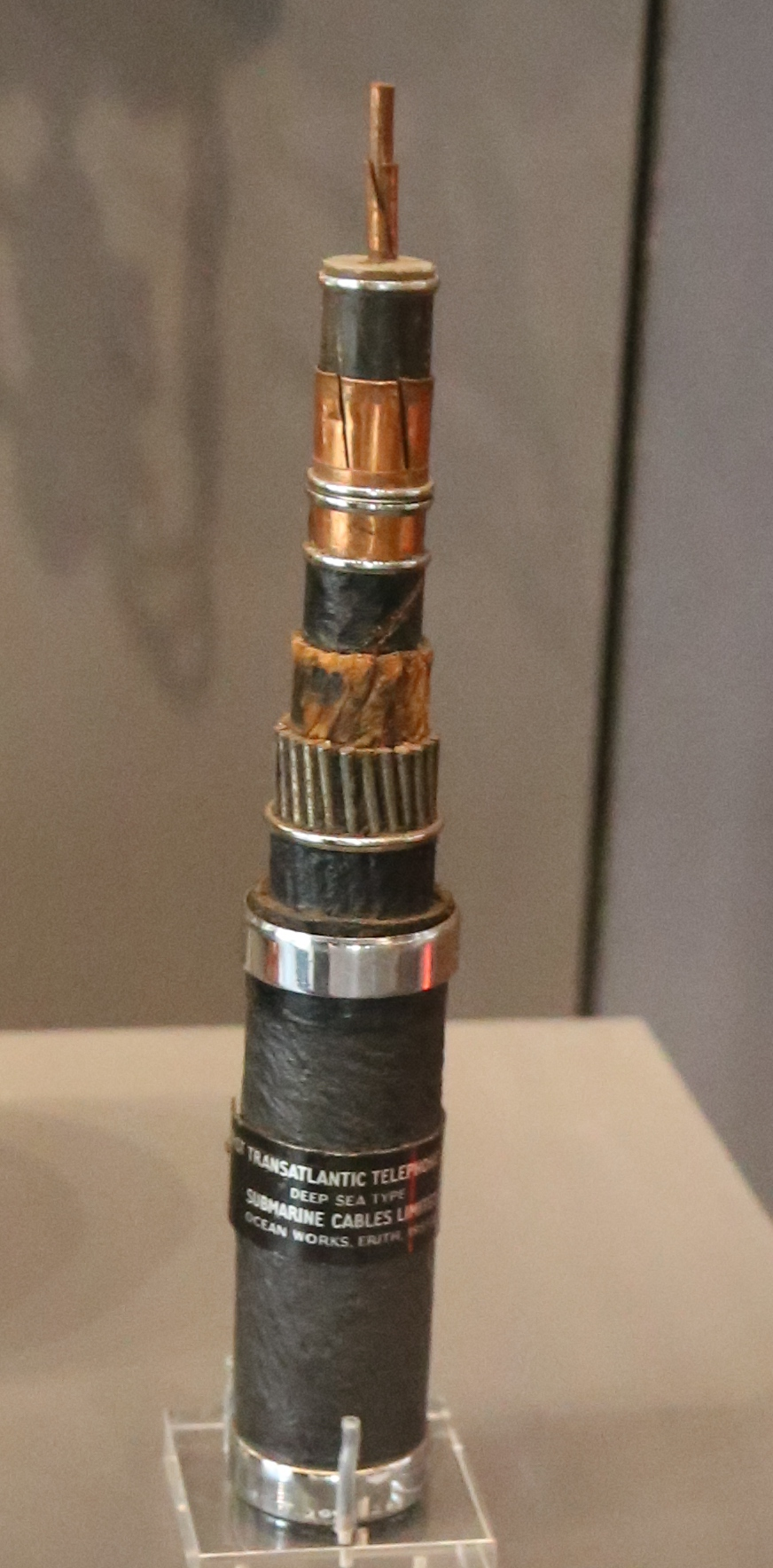
Cable similar to that laid by Ocean Layer between California and Hawaii

In October 1955, she laid her first cable, a 67-nautical-mile (124 km) long telephone cable in the Skaggerak. In 1952, she laid 1,218 nautical miles (2,256 km) of cable between Pernambuco, Bahia and Vitoria, Brazil. In August 1956, she laid a power cable in the Gulf of Georgia, linking mainland British Columbia with Vancouver Island. In July 1956, Monarch and Ocean Layer laid a cable for American Telephone and Telegraph between California, United States, and Hawaii. At 2,400 nautical miles (4,400 km), it was then the longest in the world. In 1957–58, she laid cables in the Indian Ocean and in 1959 she renewed 900 nautical miles (1,700 km) of cable off the coast of Brazil.

In 1959, she was engaged to lay TAT-2 in the Atlantic Ocean. On 15 June, a fire started in the crew's quarters whilst she was 700 nautical miles (1,300 km) west of Ouessant, Finistère, France (48°26′N 19°03′W). The ship was abandoned. Her 86 crew and twelve telephone executives on board were rescued by the German ship Flavia, which took her in tow. USNS Upshur was also sent to assist in the rescue. A Royal Air Force Avro Shackleton was despatched from Cornwall with life-saving equipment on board, but was subsequently recalled. On 17 June, the tow was transferred to the German salvage tug Wotan. The Dutch tug Loire had reached Ocean Layer first, but was refused the tow as a contract had already been made with Wotan's owners.

She arrived at Falmouth, Cornwall on 19 June still on fire. On 22 June, the Falmouth harbourmaster called the Cornwall Fire Brigade to attend the burning ship and extinguish the fire. Access was refused by the captain of Wotan, who claimed that maritime law dictated that it was his responsibility to extinguish the fire before handing the ship over. He said it would take two or three days before the fire was put out. Ocean Layer was handed over to the port authorities at Falmouth on 25 June.

At an inquiry into the loss of the ship, it was claimed that an electric heater in one of the cabins had been the cause of the fire. The inquiry found that the probable cause was an electric stove had been placed under a crewman's bunk whilst still hot after being used, although disconnected from the electricity supply. The order to abandon ship had been given about 40 minutes after the fire started. Firefighting efforts were deemed ineffective. The emergency fire pump failed at an early stage because its power supply had been destroyed by the fire. Declared a constructive total loss, Ocean Layer was scrapped at Hendrik-Ido-Ambacht, South Holland, Netherlands, in December 1959.
