= Greek steamer Othon =

SS Othon
History
- Name: Othon (1838–62); Athinai (1862–64)
- Builder: Poros Naval Shipyard
- Launched: 1838
- Decommissioned: 1864

General characteristics
- Type: Paddle steamer
- Tonnage: 430 tons
- Installed power: 2 × 120 hp (89 kW) steam engines
- Propulsion: Paddle wheels
- Speed: 9 knots (17 km/h; 10 mph)
- Complement: 59
- Armament: 2 × 18 pdr (8.2 kg) long guns; 4 × 32 pdr (15 kg) carronades

The Othon (Greek: Όθων) was a military 430-ton paddle steamer of the Hellenic Navy, named after the first king of independent Greece, Otto. It was designed by naval architect Georgios Tombazis and built in 1838 at the Poros Naval Shipyard. It was powered by 2 Maudslay Sons & Field 120 hp steam engines, and was armed with two 18 pounder long guns and four 32 pounder carronades; total crew was 59 (officers and men). The ship was renamed Athinai ("Athens") after Otto's ousting in 1862 and decommissioned in 1864.

== Bibliography ==
- Skartsis, L.S. (2012). Greek vehicle & machine manufacturers 1800 to present: A pictorial history (eBook). Marathon. pp. 304–305. ISBN 978-960-93-4452-4.
