= Goulandris-class patrol boat =

Greek series of coastal patrol boats

Class overview
- Name: Goulandris-class
- Builders: Neorion
- Operators: Greece
- In commission: 1975–1990
- Completed: 2
- Lost: 1
- Retired: 1

General characteristics
- Type: Patrol boat
- Displacement: 40 long tons (41 t)
- Length: 24 m (78 ft 9 in)
- Propulsion: 2 × 1,350 hp (1,007 kW) marine diesel engines
- Speed: 26 knots (48 km/h; 30 mph)
- Armament: 1 × 20 mm gun

The Goulandris-class were a series of two coastal patrol boats built by the Neorion shipyard and donated to the Hellenic Navy in 1975 and 1977 respectively. They were 40-ton, 24-metre boats, powered by two 1350 hp diesel engines, and armed with a 20 mm gun.

== Ships ==
- Goulandris I (P-289) was built at the Neorion shipyard and donated to the Hellenic Navy. She was commissioned on 25 June 1975, and decommissioned in 1990.
- Goulandris II (P-290), was also built at the Neorion shipyard and donated to the Hellenic Navy on 25 April 1977. She was destroyed by fire and sunk south of Lesbos Island (38°54.7′N 26°28′E) without casualties on 24 June 1983.

== External link ==
- L.S. Skartsis, "Modern Greece's Machines: A Comprehensive Guide to Greek Vehicle & Machine Manufacturers (1700 to Present)" (2026) ISBN 978-618-00-6734-7 (eBook)
