= USS Hall (DD-583) =

Fletcher-class destroyer

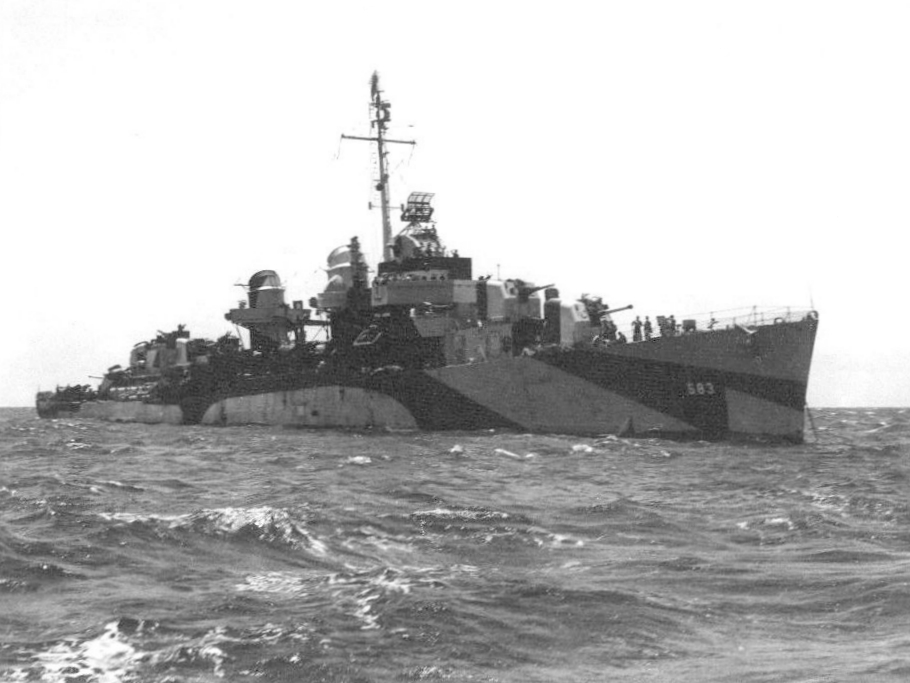
- USS Hall (DD-583) at anchor c1944

History

United States
- Name: USS Hall
- Namesake: Elijah Hall
- Builder: Boston Navy Yard
- Laid down: 16 April 1942
- Launched: 18 July 1942
- Sponsored by: Mrs. Elizabeth Williams Greenleaf
- Commissioned: 6 July 1943
- Decommissioned: 10 December 1946
- Stricken: 1 September 1975
- Identification: DD-583
- Fate: Transferred to Hellenic Navy, 9 February 1960

Greece
- Name: Lonchi
- Acquired: 9 February 1960
- Decommissioned: 1 October 1990
- Stricken: 10 October 1990
- Identification: D56
- Fate: Scrapped, 1997

General characteristics
- Class & type: Fletcher-class destroyer
- Displacement: 2,050 tons
- Length: 376 ft 6 in (114.76 m)
- Beam: 39 ft 8 in (12.09 m)
- Draft: 17 ft 9 in (5.41 m)
- Propulsion: 60,000 shp (45,000 kW); 2 propellers
- Speed: 35 knots (65 km/h; 40 mph)
- Range: 6,500 nmi (12,000 km; 7,500 mi) at 15 kn (28 km/h; 17 mph)
- Complement: 329
- Armament: 5 × 5 in (130 mm)/38 cal. guns; 4 × 40 mm AA guns, 4 × 20 mm AA guns, 10 × 21 inch (533 mm) torpedo tubes, 6 × depth charge projectors, 2 × depth charge tracks

USS Hall (DD-583) was a Fletcher-class destroyer of the United States Navy. Hall entered service in 1943 and deployed to the Pacific theater. Following the war, the ship was placed in reserve until 1959, when she was sold to the Hellenic Navy and renamed Lonchi. The destroyer remained in service with the Hellenic Navy until 1990 and was scrapped in 1997.

== Namesake ==
Elijah Hall was born on 8 December 1742 in Raynham, Massachusetts. He was appointed Lieutenant in the Continental Navy on 14 June 1777, to serve on the frigate USS Ranger under John Paul Jones. Ranger sailed for France on 1 November 1777, taking two prizes en route, then put to sea from Brest, France on 10 April 1778, to cruise in the Irish Sea. Hall took part in the capture of several vessels, the landing at St. Mary's Isle on 23 April and the capture of HMS Drake the next day. Hall commanded the prize crew which took Drake into Brest. Hall continued to serve as Lieutenant of Ranger until he was captured at Charleston, South Carolina on 12 May 1780. Released after the end of the war, Hall settled in Portsmouth, New Hampshire in 1818 and held various community positions until his death there on 22 June 1830.

== Construction and career ==
Hall was laid down by the Boston Navy Yard on 16 April 1942 and was launched on 18 July 1942, sponsored by Mrs. Elizabeth Williams Greenleaf, great-granddaughter of Lt. Hall. The ship was commissioned on 6 July 1943.

Hall departed Boston, Massachusetts on 11 August 1943, for shakedown training off the East Coast, then reported for duty at Norfolk, Virginia on 28 September. As an escort for French transport Richelieu, she sailed for Boston on 2 October, returning three days later. She continued escort duties in the Norfolk and Boston areas until departing 5 November for special duty with the destroyers Halligan and Macomb. The three destroyers rendezvoused at sea with the battleship Iowa, carrying President Franklin D. Roosevelt and other dignitaries to the Teheran Conference. After a safe crossing, the escorts were relieved of their duties near Gibraltar on 17 November. They performed escort and antisubmarine search duties off western Africa until 6 December, then rejoined Iowa for the return voyage of the President and his party.

=== 1944 ===
Ordered to the Pacific, Hall departed Charleston, South Carolina on 21 December and arrived at Pearl Harbor 11 January 1944. On 22 January, she cleared Hawaii with Rear Admiral Richmond K. Turner's Expeditionary Force bound for the capture and occupation of the Marshall Islands, a giant step across the Pacific toward Japan. Sent with three cruisers and three other destroyers on a special mission to wreck the airfields on Tarao Island during the invasion, Hall joined in the devastating bombardment of that island 30 January. Her guns knocked out a gasoline dump with a tremendous explosion, hit several gun emplacements, and then screened the larger ships during the remainder of the firing. Tarao effectively neutralized, the ships then sailed for Kwajalein and the main assault.

Hall carried out varied duties during the month-long invasion of the Marshalls. On 4 February, she supported the landing of troops on Burnet Island in the Battle of Kwajalein. During the Battle of Eniwetok on 18 February, she covered the landings of Engebi Island and supplied gunfire support, and furnished star shell illumination for landings on 22 to 23 February on Parry Island. After an escort voyage with transports to Pearl Harbor and back between 29 February and 26 March, Hall was assigned patrol and lifeguard duties in the Kwajalein area. On 4 April, while searching for a downed Marine flyer near Wotje, she received two 6-inch shells close aboard from an enemy shore battery. Suffering one sailor killed, she returned the fire, continued her search, and finally rescued the airman. Hall continued her effective role in the overwhelming amphibious victory until departing Majuro atoll 12 May for Pearl Harbor, where she arrived 18 May.

Hall next joined the escort for a group of 12 fleet oilers whose job it was to supply vital fuel to units of the 5th Fleet during the Marianas operations. She made two fuelling voyages from Majuro to the Marianas, then shifted her base to Seeadler Harbor, Admiralty Islands, on 26 August to screen refuelling and replacement units during the operations for the capture of the Carolines. Hall continued this duty until 24 November.

Getting underway from Manus Island on 29 November, Hall steamed to Humboldt Bay, New Guinea, to join 7th Fleet for the developing invasion of the Philippines. Convoying troop-laden amphibious ships, she arrived at Leyte Gulf on 7 December 1944, and 4 days later steamed out of San Pedro Bay for Mindoro Island with the Mindoro Attack Group. As the ships passed through Surigao Strait and into the Sulu Sea, they underwent frequent severe air attacks, but the escort ships succeeded in downing four aircraft by 13 December. On 15 December, Hall and the other escorts supported the landings at Mangarin Bay and, as Japanese planes bombed and strafed the first wave of assault troops, Hall patrolled and fired from her station to seaward of the landing craft. The gunfire and covering aircraft splashed 15 dive-bombers during the initial landings.

=== 1945 ===
After two escort voyages to Leyte Gulf, Hall joined Admiral Jesse B. Oldendorf's support force for the landings at Lingayen Gulf. Sailing 30 December, she steamed via the Sulu Sea for Luzon. On 3 January 1945, the group encountered desperate, but determined, enemy air strikes, which were repelled by tight air cover and effective gunfire. The Japanese attacks intensified, however, and the ships remained at nearly continuous battle stations for more than 4 days. Brave men in these gallant ships inflicted heavy damage on the attackers. Japanese kamikazes, in turn, fatally hit the escort carrier Ommaney Bay 4 January, and the burning, abandoned carrier was sunk by American torpedoes. The next two days brought even heavier Japanese attacks. Despite the withering curtain of fire laid down by Hall and other ships of the group, the suicide raiders crashed more than 16 ships, including the battleships California and New Mexico. Undaunted, the valiant ships bore the brunt of the kamikazes with resolute courage and determination. In doing so, they repelled the menace of the suicide planes and saved the transport and assault forces from certain destruction.

Following the successful amphibious assaults in Lingayen Gulf on 9 January, Hall continued to operate in the Gulf where she served as an escort and screen ship. Later in the month on 29 January, she returned to Leyte before departing for Ulithi. At Ulithi Hall joined in the preparations for the upcoming Iwo Jima operation. On 15 February she joined a fire support unit, which included flagship Texas, west of Saipan and set course for Iwo Jima. The force arrived off Iwo the next day; after joining in a heavy shore bombardment, Hall covered underwater demolition teams and furnished close fire support for minesweepers until the troops stormed ashore 19 February. After performing additional patrol and close fire support missions during this fiercely fought and strategically important invasion, Hall returned to Ulithi on 12 March to prepare for the invasion of Okinawa, the last step on the long, bloody road to the heart of the Japanese Empire.

On 21 March, Hall departed for Okinawa with Task Force 54 (TF-54). She began patrolling off that fiercely contested island on 25 March. Her gunfire drove off two Japanese torpedo boats on 30 March, and shot down two aircraft on 6 April. Continuing her operations, she covered minesweepers with gunfire, screened heavy units of the fleet, and provided close support gunfire until steaming to Leyte 28 May. She soon returned to the scene of the action, arriving back at Okinawa on 13 June. On 16 June, her lookouts observed the destroyer Twiggs strike a mine off the beach. Hall immediately came to the rescue, pulling 48 survivors from the water.

Detached from duty off Okinawa 23 June, Hall sailed for the United States. She was in overhaul status at San Pedro, California, when news of the Japanese surrender came. She reported to San Diego for inactivation, was decommissioned 10 December 1946, and entered the Pacific Reserve Fleet at Long Beach. The destroyer was taken out of reserve on 2 December 1959 and, after a training period, was loaned to Greece under the Military Assistance Program on 9 February 1960.

=== Greek service ===
The ship was accepted on 9 February 1960 by Cdr C. Moschos HN. She served in the Hellenic Navy as Lonchi (D56).

Decommissioned on 1 October 1990, Lonchi was stricken 10 October 1990. She was scrapped in 1997 at Aliağa, Turkey.

== Awards ==
Hall received eight battle stars for World War II service.
