= Greek landing ship Chios (L195) =

1943 LST-1-class tank landing ship

History

United States
- Name: LST-35
- Builder: Dravo Corporation, Pittsburgh, Pennsylvania
- Laid down: 20 March 1943
- Launched: 30 June 1943
- Sponsored by: Mrs. Samuel G. Cooper
- Stricken: 23 June 1947
- Identification: Hull symbol: LST-35
- Fate: Transferred to the Royal Hellenic Navy, 18 August 1943

Greece
- Name: Chios
- Namesake: Chios
- Acquired: 18 August 1943
- Decommissioned: 10 May 1977
- Identification: Hull symbol: L195
- Fate: Sold to Greece, January 1947
- Status: Fate unknown

General characteristics
- Type: LST-1-class tank landing ship
- Displacement: 4,080 long tons (4,145 t) full load; 2,160 long tons (2,190 t) landing
- Length: 328 ft (100 m) oa
- Beam: 50 ft (15 m)
- Draft: Full load: 8 ft 2 in (2.49 m) forward; 14 ft 1 in (4.29 m) aft; Landing at 2,160 t: 3 ft 11 in (1.19 m) forward; 9 ft 10 in (3.00 m) aft
- Installed power: 2 × 900 hp (670 kW) Electro-Motive Diesel 12-567A diesel engines; 1,700 shp (1,300 kW)
- Propulsion: 1 × Falk main reduction gears; 2 × Propellers
- Speed: 12 kn (22 km/h; 14 mph)
- Range: 24,000 nmi (44,000 km; 28,000 mi) at 9 kn (17 km/h; 10 mph) while displacing 3,960 long tons (4,024 t)
- Boats & landing craft carried: 2 or 6 x LCVPs
- Capacity: 2,100 tons oceangoing maximum; 350 tons main deckload
- Troops: 16 officers, 147 enlisted men
- Complement: 13 officers, 104 enlisted men
- Armament: Varied, ultimate armament; 2 × twin 40 mm (1.57 in) Bofors guns; 4 × single 40 mm Bofors guns; 12 × 20 mm (0.79 in) Oerlikon cannons

USS LST-35 was an LST-1-class tank landing ship of the United States Navy built during World War II. She was transferred to the Royal Hellenic Navy on 18 August 1943, before being commissioned into the USN, and was renamed Chios.

== Construction ==
LST-35 was laid down on 20 March 1943, at Pittsburgh, Pennsylvania, by the Dravo Corporation; launched on 30 June 1943; sponsored by Mrs. Samuel G. Cooper; and transferred to the Royal Hellenic Navy on 18 August 1943, and renamed Chios (L195).

== Service history ==
Chios, ex-LST-35, sailed from Galveston Bar for Key West, Florida, on 28 August 1943, with convoy HK 125, arriving in Key West, 1 September 1943.

On 11 October 1943, Chios left Halifax, Nova Scotia, in convoy SC 144, en route she joined convoy WN 497 that had departed Loch Ewe, on 26 October. She arrived in Methil, Scotland, on 28 October with a load of lumber.

Chios departed Methil, on 3 December 1943, in convoy EN 314 (series 2), arriving in Loch Ewe, on 5 December. She departed Liverpool, England, in convoy OS 63/KMS 37, on 25 December 1943. The convoy split on 7 January 1944, with Chios continuing on in convoy KMS 37G, arriving in Gibraltar, on 9 January. However, the same records show that she departed Liverpool, England, in convoy OS 64/KMS 38, on 3 January 1944. The convoy split on 15 January 1944, with Chios continuing on in convoy KMS 38G, arriving in Gibraltar, on 17 January. It's possible that she was delayed from sailing in the first, here intended convoy, and had to travel in the proceeding convoy.

== Post-war service ==
She was sold to the government of Greece in January 1947. She was struck from the Navy list on 23 June 1947. She served until 1971, when she was placed in reserve. Reactivated in 1974, she was finally decommissioned from the Greek navy on 10 May 1977.

Featured in the movie Operation Mercury (1971). at 1.05:45.

== Bibliography ==
- "LST-35". Dictionary of American Naval Fighting Ships. Naval History and Heritage Command. 4 August 2015. This article incorporates text from this source, which is in the public domain.
- "LST-35". NavSource. 12 October 2012.
- "Convoy EN.314 (Series 2)". Arnold Hague Convoy Database.
- "Convoy HK.125". Arnold Hague Convoy Database.
- "Convoy KMS.37G". Arnold Hague Convoy Database.
- "Convoy KMS.38G". Arnold Hague Convoy Database.
- "Convoy OS.63/ KMS.37". Arnold Hague Convoy Database.
- "Convoy OS.64/ KMS.38". Arnold Hague Convoy Database.
- "Convoy SC.144". Arnold Hague Convoy Database.
- "Convoy WN.497". Arnold Hague Convoy Database.
