= HMS Upstart =

Submarine of the Royal Navy

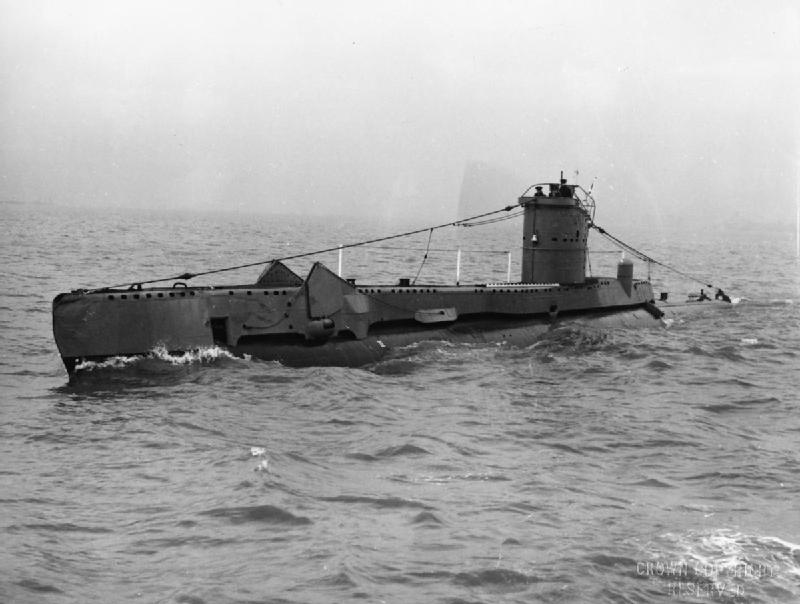
- HMS Upstart, 15 February 1952

History

United Kingdom
- Name: HMS Upstart
- Builder: Vickers-Armstrongs, Barrow-in-Furness
- Laid down: 17 March 1942
- Launched: 24 November 1942
- Commissioned: 3 April 1943
- Out of service: Loaned to Greek Navy from 1945
- Fate: Sunk as ASDIC target 29 July 1959
- Badge

Greece
- Name: Amfitriti
- In service: 1945
- Fate: Returned to Royal Navy in 1952

General characteristics
- Class & type: U-class submarine
- Displacement: Surfaced - 540 tons standard, 630 tons full load; Submerged - 730 tons
- Length: 58.22 m (191 ft)
- Beam: 4.90 m (16 ft 1 in)
- Draught: 4.62 m (15 ft 2 in)
- Propulsion: 2 shaft diesel-electric; 2 Paxman Ricardo diesel generators + electric motors; 615 / 825 hp
- Speed: 11.25 knots (20.8 km/h) max surfaced; 10 knots (19 km/h) max submerged
- Complement: 27-31
- Armament: 4 bow internal 21 inch (533 mm) torpedo tubes - 8 - 10 torpedoes; 1 - 3-inch (76 mm) gun

HMS Upstart (P65) was a Royal Navy U-class submarine built by Vickers-Armstrongs. So far she has been the only ship of the Royal Navy to bear the name Upstart. After the war, she was loaned to the Greek Navy and renamed Amfitriti.

== Career ==
=== Wartime ===
Upstart spent most of her wartime career operating off the south coast of France, where she sank the French fishing vessels Grotte de Bethlehem and Torpille, the German auxiliary minelayer Niedersachsen (the former French Guyane) and the German merchant Tolentino (the former French Saumur). She also launched failed attacks against the French merchant Medjerda and the Italian merchant Pascoli.

=== Greek service ===
Upstart survived the war and was loaned to the Greek Navy in 1945, where she was renamed Amfitriti. She served with the Greek Navy for seven years, and was returned to the Royal Navy in 1952. She was subsequently sunk as an ASDIC target off the Isle of Wight on 29 July 1959.
