= USS LST-391 =

1942 LST-1-class tank landing ship

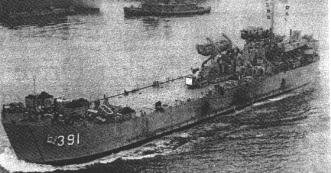
- LST-391

History

United States
- Name: USS LST-391
- Builder: Newport News Shipbuilding and Drydock Company, Newport News, Virginia
- Laid down: 14 July 1942
- Launched: 28 October 1942
- Commissioned: 3 December 1942
- Honors and awards: 3 battle stars (WWII)
- Renamed: USS Bowman County, 1 July 1955
- Namesake: Bowman County, North Dakota
- Fate: Transferred to Greece, May 1960

Greece
- Name: Rodos (L157)
- Acquired: May 1960

General characteristics
- Class & type: LST-1-class tank landing ship
- Displacement: 1,625 long tons (1,651 t) light; 4,080 long tons (4,145 t) full
- Length: 328 ft (100 m)
- Beam: 50 ft (15 m)
- Draft: Unloaded: Bow: 2 ft 4 in (0.71 m); Stern: 7 ft 6 in (2.29 m); Loaded : Bow: 8 ft 2 in (2.49 m); Stern: 14 ft 1 in (4.29 m)
- Depth: 8 ft (2.4 m) forward; 14 ft 4 in (4.37 m) aft (full load)
- Propulsion: 2 General Motors 12-567 diesel engines, two shafts, twin rudders
- Speed: 12 knots (22 km/h; 14 mph)
- Boats & landing craft carried: Two or six LCVPs
- Troops: 14–16 officers, 131–147 enlisted men
- Complement: 7–9 officers, 104–120 enlisted men
- Armament: 2 × twin 40 mm gun mounts w/Mk.51 directors; 4 × single 40 mm gun mounts; 12 × single 20 mm gun mounts

USS LST-391 was an LST-1-class tank landing ship built for the United States Navy during World War II. LST-391 was laid down 14 July 1942 at the Newport News Shipbuilding and Drydock Company of Newport News, Virginia, launched 28 October 1942, sponsored by Miss Katherine Wendell Blewett, and commissioned 3 December 1942.

During World War II, LST-391 was assigned to the European Theater and participated in the Sicilian occupation (July 1943), Salerno landings (September 1943), and the Invasion of Normandy (June 1944).

LST-391 earned three battle stars for World War II service.

Renamed USS Bowman County (LST-391) on 1 July 1955 for Bowman County, North Dakota, she was the only U.S. Naval vessel to bear the name. She was transferred to Greece in May 1960 for service in the Royal Hellenic Navy and renamed Rodos (L157) where she remained in service until 1997.

Image of this LST at 13:47 in the video at http://burnpit.legion.org/2015/02/my-story-about-thule-operation-blue-jay
