= Greek corvette Nisos ton Spetson =

Originally named Agamemnon (Greek: Αγαμέμνων), this corvette was the flagship of the fleet of Laskarina Bouboulina, a key figure in the 1821 Greek War of Independence. It was built in Spetses in 1820, was armed with 18 long range cannons, and became one of the most famous ships of the War.

After Greece's independence, it was incorporated in the country's navy with the name Nisos ton Spetson (Νήσος των Σπετσών, lit. 'Island of Spetsai').

== External link ==
- L.S. Skartsis, "Modern Greece's Machines: A Comprehensive Guide to Greek Vehicle & Machine Manufacturers (1700 to Present)" (2026) ISBN 978-618-00-6734-7 (eBook)
