= Greek landing ship Lemnos =

1943 LST-1-class tank landing ship

History

United States
- Name: LST-36
- Builder: Dravo Corporation, Pittsburgh, Pennsylvania
- Laid down: 21 April 1943
- Launched: 10 July 1943
- Sponsored by: Mrs. Franklin Keen
- Stricken: 23 June 1947
- Identification: Hull symbol: LST-36
- Fate: Transferred to the Royal Hellenic Navy, 23 August 1943

Greece
- Name: Lemnos
- Namesake: Lemnos
- Acquired: 23 August 1943
- Decommissioned: 10 May 1977
- Identification: Hull symbol: L158
- Fate: Sold to Greece, January 1947

General characteristics
- Type: LST-1-class tank landing ship
- Displacement: 4,080 long tons (4,145 t) full load; 2,160 long tons (2,190 t) landing
- Length: 328 ft (100 m) oa
- Beam: 50 ft (15 m)
- Draft: Full load: 8 ft 2 in (2.49 m) forward; 14 ft 1 in (4.29 m) aft; Landing at 2,160 t: 3 ft 11 in (1.19 m) forward; 9 ft 10 in (3.00 m) aft
- Installed power: 2 × 900 hp (670 kW) Electro-Motive Diesel 12-567A diesel engines; 1,700 shp (1,300 kW)
- Propulsion: 1 × Falk main reduction gears; 2 × Propellers
- Speed: 12 kn (22 km/h; 14 mph)
- Range: 24,000 nmi (44,000 km; 28,000 mi) at 9 kn (17 km/h; 10 mph) while displacing 3,960 long tons (4,024 t)
- Boats & landing craft carried: 2 or 6 x LCVPs
- Capacity: 2,100 tons oceangoing maximum; 350 tons main deckload
- Troops: 16 officers, 147 enlisted men
- Complement: 13 officers, 104 enlisted men
- Armament: Varied, ultimate armament; 2 × twin 40 mm (1.57 in) Bofors guns; 4 × single 40 mm Bofors guns; 12 × 20 mm (0.79 in) Oerlikon cannons

USS LST-36 was an LST-1-class tank landing ship of the United States Navy built during World War II. She was transferred to the Royal Hellenic Navy on 23 August 1943, before being commissioned into the USN, and was renamed Lemnos (Λήμνος).

== Construction ==
LST-36 was laid down on 21 April 1943, at Pittsburgh, Pennsylvania by the Dravo Corporation; launched on 10 July 1943; sponsored by Mrs. Franklin Keen; and transferred to the Hellenic Navy on 23 August 1943, and renamed Lemnos (L158).

== Service history ==
Lemnos sailed from Galveston Bar for Key West, Florida, on 28 August 1943, with convoy HK 125, arriving in Key West, 1 September 1943.

On 11 October 1943, Lemnos left Halifax, Nova Scotia, in convoy SC 144, en route she joined convoy WN 497 that had departed Loch Ewe, on 26 October. She arrived in Methil, Scotland, on 28 October with a load of lumber.

Lemnos departed Methil, on 3 December 1943, in convoy EN 314 (series 2), arriving in Loch Ewe, on 5 December. She departed Liverpool, England, in convoy OS 61/KMS 35, on 8 December 1943. The convoy split on 20 December 1943, with Lemnos continuing on in convoy KMS 35G, arriving in Gibraltar, on 21 December.

On 22 May 1944, Lemnos departed Augusta, Sicily, with convoy VN 41, arriving in Naples, Italy, the following day. She later returned to Augusta, in convoy NV 46, departing Naples, on 16 June, and arriving the next day.

Lemnos sailed for Taranto, Italy, on 9 January 1945, in convoy HP 19, arriving in Piraeus, Greece, on 12 January 1945.

== Post-war service ==
She was sold to the government of Greece in January 1947, and struck from the Navy list on 23 June 1947. She was decommissioned from the Greek navy on 10 May 1977.

== Bibliography ==
- "LST-36". Dictionary of American Naval Fighting Ships. Naval History and Heritage Command. 4 August 2015. This article incorporates text from this source, which is in the public domain.
- "LST-36". NavSource. 27 August 2010.
- "Convoy EN.314 (Series 2)". Arnold Hague Convoy Database.
- "Convoy HK.125". Arnold Hague Convoy Database.
- "Convoy KMS.35G". Arnold Hague Convoy Database.
- "Convoy OS.61/ KMS.35". Arnold Hague Convoy Database.
- "Convoy NV.46". Arnold Hague Convoy Database.
- "Convoy SC.144". Arnold Hague Convoy Database.
- "Convoy HP.19". Arnold Hague Convoy Database.
- "Convoy VN.41". Arnold Hague Convoy Database.
- "Convoy WN.497". Arnold Hague Convoy Database.
