= USS Fort Mandan =

1945 Casa Grande-class dock landing ship

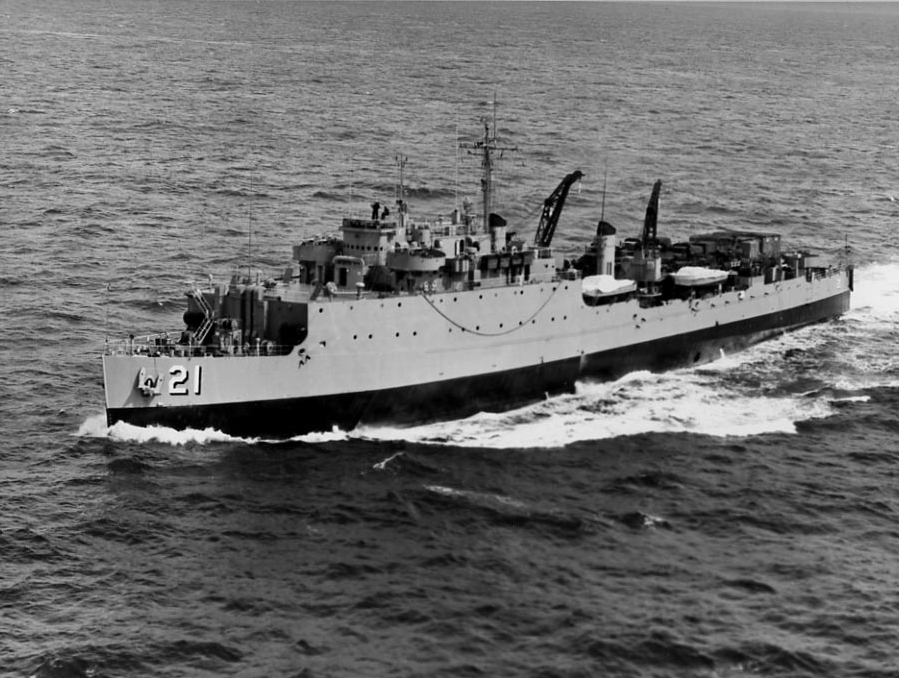
- Fort Mandan (LSD-21) underway, date and place unknown.

History

United States
- Name: USS Fort Mandan
- Namesake: Fort Mandan in North Dakota
- Laid down: 2 January 1945
- Launched: 2 June 1945
- Commissioned: 31 October 1945
- Decommissioned: 23 January 1971
- Identification: LSD-21
- Fate: Transferred to Greece, 23 January 1971
- Stricken: 8 February 1980
- Motto: Victoriam Portamus
- Nickname(s): "The Fort"

Greece
- Name: Nafkratousa
- Acquired: 23 January 1971
- Decommissioned: 29 February 2000
- Identification: L153
- Fate: Sold for scrap, November 2001

General characteristics
- Displacement: 7,930 tons (loaded), 4,032 tons (light draft)
- Length: 457 ft 9 in (139.52 m), overall
- Beam: 72 ft 2 in (22.00 m)
- Draft: 8 ft 2.5 in (2.502 m) fwd, 10 ft 0.5 in (3.061 m) aft (light); 15 ft 5.5 in (4.712 m) fwd, 16 ft 2 in (4.93 m) aft (loaded)
- Propulsion: 2 Babcock & Wilcox boilers; 2 geared turbines; 2 propeller shafts - each shaft 3,700 hp (2,800 kW) @ 240 rpm; 7,400 shp (5,500 kW) total; 2 11 ft 9 in (3.58 m) diameter, 9 ft 9 in (2.97 m) pitch propellers
- Speed: 17 knots (31 km/h) (31 km/h)
- Endurance: 8,000 nautical miles @ 15 knots (15,000 km @ 28 km/h)
- Boats & landing craft carried: One of the following: 3 × LCT (Mk V or VI) each w/ 5 medium tanks; 2 × LCT (Mk III or IV); each w/ 12 medium tanks; 14 × LCM (Mk III); each w/ 1 medium tank; 1,500 long tons (1,500 t) cargo; 47 × DUKW; 41 × LVT; Any combination of landing vehicles and landing craft up to capacity
- Capacity: 22 officers, 218 men
- Complement: 17 officers, 237 men (ship); 6 officers, 30 men (landing craft)
- Armament: 1 × 5 in / 38 cal. DP gun; 2 × 40 mm quad AA guns; 2 × 40 mm twin AA guns; 16 × 20 mm AA guns
- Aircraft carried: modified to accommodate helicopters on an added portable deck

USS Fort Mandan (LSD-21) was a Casa Grande-class dock landing ship of the United States Navy, named in honor of Fort Mandan, the encampment at which the Lewis and Clark Expedition wintered in 1804–1805, in what is now North Dakota.

== Construction and career ==
=== United States service ===
Fort Mandan was launched on 2 June 1945 by Boston Navy Yard, Boston, Massachusetts, sponsored by Mrs. Powell M. Rhea; and commissioned on 31 October 1945.

Fort Mandan was assigned first to the Atlantic Reserve Fleet following her shakedown training in Chesapeake Bay, but later was assigned to duty with the Service Force, 2nd Fleet.

She spent the next year in routine operations off the Atlantic coast. In April and May 1947 she participated in 8th Fleet exercises, and cruised with the United States Naval Academy and NROTC midshipmen to northern European ports during June and July. On 16 January 1948 she was placed out of commission in the Atlantic Reserve Fleet.

The outbreak of the Korean War occasioned her reactivation and on 25 October 1950, Fort Mandan was recommissioned, with Captain Philip D. Quirk, USN, commanding. In December she joined the Amphibious Force, Atlantic Fleet.

During 1951 she engaged in Atlantic Fleet exercises through 17 May, conducted drills in the Caribbean through 29 August, and following a brief cruise in Caribbean waters underwent preparations for the "Convex" operation which occurred from 28 February to 31 March 1952. Fort Mandan participated in the first NATO maneuvers, Operation Mainbrace, in August and September 1952, and cruised with the 6th Fleet in the Mediterranean from October to January 1953. Returning to the United States, she exercised in the Norfolk area until September when she weighed anchor to take part in Operation "Sunec" with calls at Greenland, Labrador, and Newfoundland.

During 1954 she was overhauled at Norfolk Navy Yard, took refresher training at Narragansett Bay and another "Sunec" cruise on which she visited Baffin Island, Labrador, and Newfoundland. Two training cruises in the Caribbean in 1955 were succeeded by a third "Sunec" deployment on which she crossed the Arctic Circle for the second time.

In 1956 Fort Mandan conducted amphibious training exercises at Vieques, Puerto Rico, and underwent overhaul at Baltimore before steaming again for the far north where she cruised in September and October. Amphibious exercises again occupied her during November 1956 and much of 1957 when she joined in "Caribex" in the Panama Canal Zone and "Narmid" 1 and 2. From September through November 1957 she was attached to MSTS for Arctic Service, successfully transporting Army men and equipment from Greenland to Newfoundland and Virginia in a winter closing-out operation.

Caribbean exercises kept her active during the first half of 1958. In the summer months she received an overhaul at Norfolk to prepare her for more exercises in the Caribbean and a cruise to Halifax and Argentia in November.

In February 1959 she joined the 6th Fleet for maneuvers in the Mediterranean where she remained until August. On 3 July, while visiting the French port of Sète, Fort Mandan sailors assisted local firefighters in extinguishing a fire on the Italian gasoline tanker Ombrina. In the fall Fort Mandan operated from Little Creek, Virginia, in conducting drills and exercises along the Virginia Capes area and in 1960 she again carried troops and equipment for amphibious landings in the Caribbean.

Bill Cosby served in Fort Mandan in 1960 as a Hospital corpsman (HM3). In 1962 the ship made her film debut in The Longest Day, filmed as five LCM-6s with troops and equipment moved out of her welldeck.

Fort Mandan received a Fleet Rehabilitation and Modernization (FRAM II) overhaul in 1962.

On 23 January 1971, Fort Mandan was decommissioned at Norfolk, Virginia, and transferred to Greece under the Security Assistance Program. She was stricken from the Naval Vessel Register and sold to Greece on 8 February 1980.

=== Greek service ===
Arriving in Greece on 30 March 1971, the ship served in the Hellenic Navy as Nafkratousa (L153), replacing another Casa Grande ship—the former HMS Eastway—which had operated as Nafkratousa (L153) from 1953 until Fort Mandan's acquisition.

The former Fort Mandan was decommissioned by the Hellenic Navy on 29 February 2000, and sold for scrap in November 2001, to be dismantled at Aliağa, Turkey.
