= Ioannis Ipitis =

Greek admiral and writer

- Ιωάννης Ηπίτης
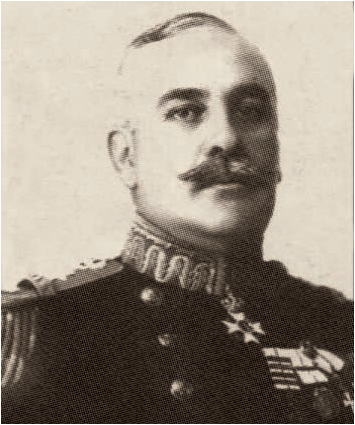
- Ioannis Ipitis c. 1922
- Born: 3 August 1867; Athens, Kingdom of Greece
- Died: 20 September 1956 (aged 89); Athens, Kingdom of Greece
- Education: Hellenic Naval Academy
- Relatives: Antonios Kriezis
- Military career
- Allegiance: Kingdom of Greece
- Service years: 1888–1923; 1946–1950
- Rank: Vice Admiral
- Commands: Niki; Sfendoni; Hydra; Georgios Averof
- Conflicts: Balkan Wars; First Balkan War; Battle of Elli; Battle of Lemnos; Second Balkan War; Greco-Turkish War (1919-1922); Bombardment of Samsun
- Awards: Commander of the Order of the Redeemer; Cross of Valour

Ioannis Ipitis (1867–1956) was a Greek admiral and writer. He served as Chief of the General Staff of the Navy from 9 November 1920 to 26 April 1921.

== Biography ==
=== Family and Origin ===
Ioannis Ipitis was born on 3 August 1867, in Athens, into a fairly well-known family in the Greek capital. His grandfather was physician Petros Ipitos (1795–1861) who was a well-known member of the revolutionary organization Filiki Eteria, a participant in the Greek War of Independence and the personal physician of Alexander Ypsilantis. His father, Theodoros Ipitos (1822–1879), was born in Odessa, studied at Greek, Russian, French universities, graduated from a military school in St. Petersburg and was a Russian and then a Greek officer. His mother was from the family of a famous participant in the Greek War of Independence, captain and ship owner, and then Vice Admiral and Prime Minister of the country Antonios Kriezis. The elder brother, Antonis Ipitis (1854–1927), became an army officer, a teacher at the Hellenic Military Academy, and then a compiler and publisher of famous Greek-French and French-Greek dictionaries.

=== Military career ===
Ipitis was admitted to the newly established Hellenic Naval Academy at the age of 19, he transferred to the newly created School of Naval Cadets. He graduated from college on 18 June 1888, with the rank of ensign. From 1903 to 1905 he taught electrical at the Naval Cadets School and was the deputy director of the school. From 1906 to 1907 he was in the group of officers overseeing the construction of the destroyer Sfendoni at the Yarrow Shipbuilders in the United Kingdom.

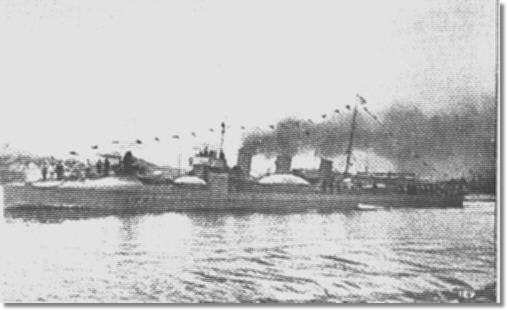
Destroyer Niki

From to 1911–1912, he became the director of the Naval Cadet School. In early 1912 he was appointed commander of the destroyer Niki.

=== Balkan Wars ===
By the beginning of the Balkan Wars (1912–1913) Ipitis was the captain of the destroyer Sfendoni. Since the beginning of the war, the destroyer carried the pennant of the commander of the First Destroyer Group, Captain I. Ipitis (Sfendoni, Lonchi, Navkratus).

On 22 October 1912, the Sfendoni was sent to the island of Chios, to collect information about the Turkish forces on the island and determine the landing site.

On the morning of 1 December 1912, the Sfendoni was patrolling at the entrance to the Dardanelles, together with the Lonchi and intercepted a Turkish destroyer emerging from the straits. Greek destroyers opened fire, which was answered not by a Turkish destroyer, but by Turkish batteries from the European and Asia Minor coast. The Sfendoni and Lonchi emerged from under the fire, maneuvering. At noon of the same day, the Sfendoni struck up an unsuccessful firefight with the cruiser Medgidie, from a distance of 6,000 meters. On 12 December 1912: "Sfendoni", as part of the Greek fleet, led by the flagship armored cruiser Averof, under the command of Admiral Pavlos Kountouriotis and took part in the Greek victory over the Turkish fleet at the Battle of Elli, being between the islands of Imvros and Tenedos, in the western sector of the battle. On 18 January 1913, Sfendoni along with 4 Greek battleships and 8 destroyers took part in the subsequent Greek victory over the Turkish fleet at the Battle of Lemnos, after which the Ottoman fleet didn't dare to leave the straits. On 25 March 1913: "Sfendoni" was in the escort of ships accompanying the royal Amphitrite IV, with the body of George I, who was assassinated in Thessaloniki.

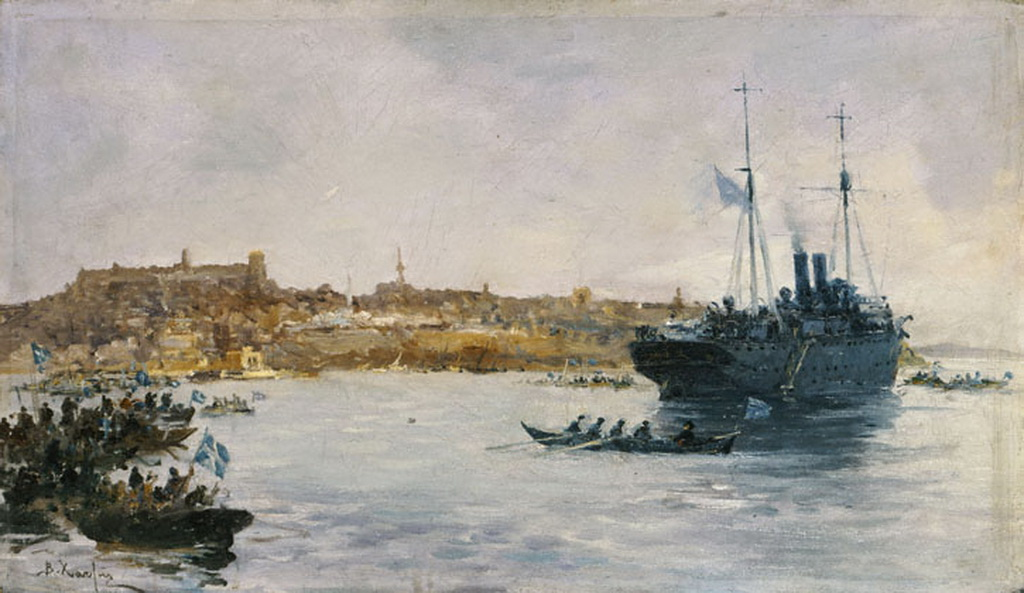
Vasileios Hatzis: The landing of the Greek fleet in Kavala, 1913.

In the short Second Balkan War, Ipitis was the captain of the battleship Hydra and led a small squadron that supported the Greek units advancing against the Bulgarian positions on Mount Pangeo with fire from the Strimonikos Bay. At the head of this squadron, Ipitis created the appearance of a landing in the gulf of the city of Kavala near Sara-Saban, which forced the Bulgarians to hastily leave Kavala, which the next day was occupied by the Hellenic Army.

=== World War I ===
Before the outbreak of the First World War, Ipitis again taught electrical engineering at the Naval Cadets School, and also wrote the textbooks Electrical Lessons (in three volumes) and On Torpedoes. After the outbreak of the First World War, and with the rank of Rear Admiral since 1914, Ipitis was the commander of the so-called "light fleet", almost all of whose ships were confiscated by the Entente in October 1916. As a monarchist, during the National Schism and after the return of Prime Minister Eleftherios Venizelos to Athens in June 1917, Ipitis was removed from command posts, demobilized and did not take part in the hostilities of the fleet.

=== Greco Turkish War of 1919-1922 ===
After the end of the First World War and under the mandate of the Entente, the Greek army landed on the western coast of Asia Minor. In the subsequent Second Greco-Turkish War, the Greek fleet had no real enemy at sea and limited itself to supporting the landing of troops, patrolling and inspecting foreign merchant ships in the Aegean Sea and several Turkish ports. The November 1920 elections were held by the monarchist People's Party under the slogan "We will bring our guys home." Having received the support of the then significant Muslim population, the monarchists won the elections. The victory of the monarchists dealt an unexpected and terrible blow to the foreign policy positions of Greece and became a fatal event for the Greek population of Asia Minor. The allies warned that if the Germanophile Konstantínos I returned to Greece, they would stop financial aid and freeze loans.

The return of Konstantínos to the country freed the allies from their obligations towards Greece. Winston Churchill, in his work The Aftermath: 1918–1922 (pp. 387–388), wrote:

The return of Constantine severed all allied ties with Greece and annulled all obligations except legal ones. We have made many commitments with Venizelos . But with Constantine, none. Indeed, when the first surprise passed, a sense of relief became evident in the leadership circles. There was no longer a need to follow the anti-Turkish policy.

Finding no solution to the problem with the Greek population of the west of Asia Minor, the new government continued the war.

Rear Admiral I. Ipitis, being a monarchist, was appointed chief of the general staff of the fleet. Ipitis remained in this post until 26 April 1921, after which he assumed command of the Second Fleet Squadron, based in Constantinople.

=== Bombardment of Samsun ===
The operations of the Greek fleet along the Black Sea coast throughout the war were limited for objective and political reasons. The coast from Heraclea to the Georgian / Soviet border remained nominally under the sultan's control, but in operational terms it was under the jurisdiction of the Royal Navy. The reconnaissance exits of the ships of the Greek fleet only stated the facts of the ongoing genocide of the Pontic Greeks. The exits of the ships of the fleet could not stop the genocide itself, just as they could not provide significant assistance to the surviving inhabitants of Pontus and the Pontic partisans hiding in the mountains. The few exits of the ships of the Greek fleet to the Black Sea were used by the Kemalists to intensify and complete the genocide of the Pontic Greeks.

In the last year of the war, the Greek fleet carried out its largest operation in the Black Sea. On 31 May 1922, a raid on Samsun was carried out. By that time, the city had become a center for supplying the Kemalists with cargo coming from Soviet Russia, and a large number of small ships for these transportation were based in its port. In addition, the Sultan's ammunition depots were located in the city, which, however, were freely used by the Kemalists. To neutralize this Kemalist supply base, a squadron was formed, which included the cruiser Averof, the destroyers Ierax and Pantir, and the auxiliary cruisers Adriaticos and Naxos. The squadron, on board the battleship Averof which was headed by Ipitis. Admiral Ipitis, before the start of the shelling, maintaining diplomatic and military etiquette, in order to avoid civilian casualties and despite the Turkish atrocities against the Greek population, gallantly informed the Turkish authorities about which port and city facilities would be fired upon. As a result of the shelling, weapons and ammunition depots, piers and moored ships, oil and gasoline tanks, barracks on Charchamba Hill, customs and port authorities were destroyed. During the shelling, the minaret and the house of the governor Faik-bey were damaged.

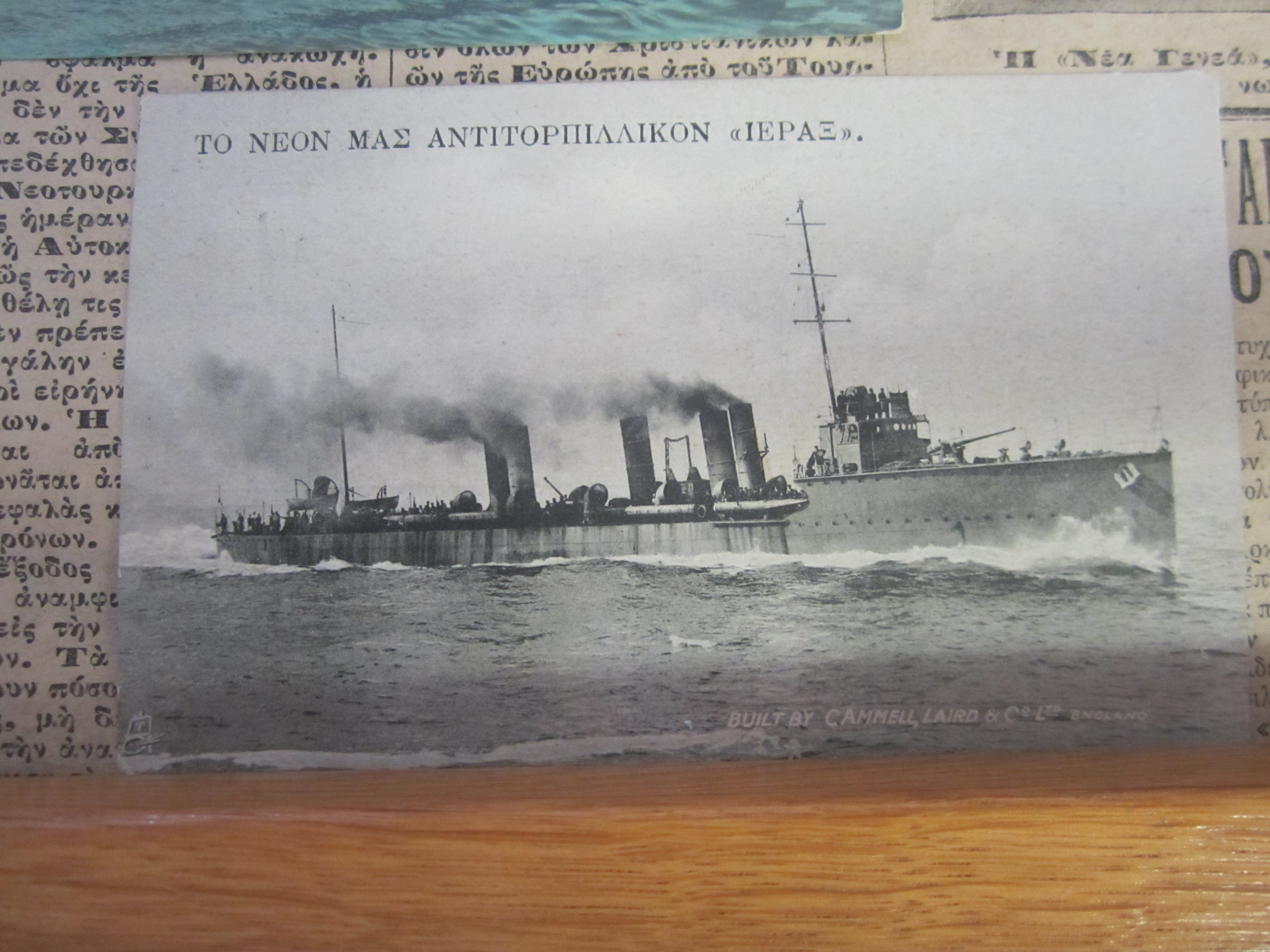
Greek destroyer Ierax at the time of acquisition in 1912.

6 Turkish field artillery batteries responded to the ships' fire, but they were suppressed by fire from the Averof and the auxiliary cruiser Naxos. 3 planes were sent from the Amasia airfield to bombard the Greek squadron. One of them was shot down by fire from the destroyer Ierax, the rest left.

=== Evacuation from Asia Minor and the uprising of the army and navy ===
The front was broken through in August 1922 and the main task of the fleet, in addition to protecting the Greek islands, was the evacuation of army units. In September, Ipitis commanded a squadron that provided fire support to the III corps of the army, during its evacuation from Panormos and Artaki to the European coast of the Sea of Marmara . As a monarchist, Ipitis did not take part in the ensuing Venizelist uprising in September 1922 the Army and Navy, and in January 1923 he was demobilized with the rank of Vice Admiral in retirement.

=== Postwar Years ===
Lieutenant Colonel Epitis took over as Commander-in-Chief of the General Staff on 9 November 1920. He resigned as Commander-in-Chief of the General Staff on 26 April 1921. In civilian life, Admiral Ipitis assisted his brother Antonios Ipitis in writing and publishing Greek-French dictionaries. Before World War II, Admiral Ipitis became the director of the Greek Maritime Union (Ελληνικής Θαλάσσια Ένωση), established in 1931, which was abolished in 1935 and its functions were transferred to the Ministry of Defense. In October 1946, Admiral Ipitis was recalled to the fleet and in 1947 he was included in the commission to consider the issue of reducing the number of officers.

In 1950, in the service government of Ioannis Theotokis, Admiral Ipitis was given the post of deputy minister of the sea.

Admiral Ipitis died in Athens on 20 September 1956.
