= Ottoman destroyer Basra =

Ottoman destroyer

History

Ottoman Empire
- Name: Basra
- Namesake: Basra
- Ordered: 22 January 1906
- Builder: Forges et Chantiers de la Gironde, Lormont
- Laid down: June 1906
- Launched: 1907
- Commissioned: 3 September 1907
- Decommissioned: 1932
- Fate: Scrapped, 1949

General characteristics
- Class & type: Samsun-class destroyer
- Displacement: 311 t (306 long tons)
- Length: 56.3 m (184 ft 9 in) (p/p)
- Beam: 6.3 m (20 ft 8 in)
- Draft: 3.17 m (10 ft 5 in)
- Depth: 4.1 m (13 ft 5 in)
- Installed power: 2 × Normand boilers; 5,200 PS (3,800 kW)
- Propulsion: 2 × Shafts; 2 × Triple-expansion steam engines
- Speed: 28 knots (52 km/h; 32 mph)
- Range: 2,300 nmi (4,300 km; 2,600 mi) at 10 knots (19 km/h; 12 mph)
- Complement: 64 officers and enlisted men
- Armament: 1 × 65 mm (2.6 in) gun; 6 × 47 mm (1.9 in) guns; 2 × 381 mm (15 in) torpedo tubes

Basra was one of the four Durandal-class destroyers purchased by the Ottoman Empire from France in 1907. The ship served in the Ottoman Navy during the Italo-Turkish War, the Balkan Wars and World War I.

== Design ==
Built at Lormont by Forges et Chantiers de la Gironde, Basra was 56.3 meters (184 ft 9 in) long between the perpendiculars and 58.2 meters (190 ft 11 in) in full length, with a beam of 58.2 meters (190 ft 11 in) and a draft of 3.17 m (10 ft 5 in). The displacement of the ship was 284 t (280 long tons). Her crew consisted of 7 officers and 60 sailors when she was built in 1907.

The ship was powered by two vertical triple-expansion steam engines, fed by steam from two water-tube boilers built by SA Chantiers et Ateliers de la Gironde. The engines had 5,950 indicated horsepower (4,440 kW) and could accelerate the ship to 28 knots (52 km/h; 32 mph) in 1907. Due to maintenance problems which were widespread throughout the Navy, the ship's speed dropped to 20 knots (37 km/h; 23 mph) in 1912 and 17 knots (31 km/h; 20 mph) in 1915. The ship could carry 60 tons of coal.

As built, the ship carried one Canon de 65 mm Modèle 1891 naval gun, six QF 3-pounder Hotchkiss guns and two 450 mm torpedo tubes.

== Construction and purchase ==
At the turn of the 20th century, during a program to strengthen the Ottoman Navy, large quantities of cannons, ammunition and supplies were ordered from Krupp in 1904. In order to maintain diplomatic and financial balance, the Ottoman government decided to place subsequent orders with France. For this purpose, four Sultanhisar-class torpedo boats were ordered from Schneider-Creusot to meet the needs of the navy. As this small order was not sufficient for the French, the 200-ton Refahiye-class gunboats and the 420-ton Marmaris were also ordered. During negotiations in 1906, the French convinced the Ottoman government to purchase four more destroyers, which were ordered on 22 January 1906. Based on the French Durandal-class destroyers, Samsun, Yarhisar and Basra were built by Ateliers de la Gironde, while Taşoz was built by Schneider et Cie.

== Operational history ==
Basra was commissioned into the Ottoman Navy on 3 September 1907 in Istanbul. On 1 October 1911, after the outbreak of the Italo-Turkish War, Basra, together with her sister ships Samsun, Yarhisar and Taşoz, became part of an Ottoman fleet directed to defend the Dardanelles (consisting, in addition to them, of the battleships Barbaros Hayreddin, Turgut Reis, the ironclad Mesudiye and the torpedo boat Demirhisar), but the following day all ships returned to Istanbul to make necessary repairs and retrieve supplies. The Ottoman fleet returned to defensive positions on October 12, with little activity until the end of the conflict.

During the First Balkan War, on 7 November 1912, the ironclad Asar-i Tevfik, Turgut Reis and Basra fired on Bulgarian troops that occupied Tekirdağ. On 12 December, Basra and Taşoz went on patrol to the waters of the Dardanelles, intending to ambush Greek destroyers, but had to return due to trouble with their boilers. Two days later, the ship, along with the torpedo boat Sultanhisar and the cruiser Mecidiye participated in an inconclusive skirmish with the Greek destroyers Sfendoni, Lonchi, Thyella and Nafkratousa. On 14 January 1913, the cruiser Hamidiye assisted by Basra and Yarhisar patrolled the entrance to the Dardanelles. On January 18, an Ottoman fleet (consisting of Barbaros Hayreddin, Mecidiye, Berk-i Satvet, Basra and Yarhisar) took part in a clash with the Greek fleet near Lemnos On 7–11 February 1913, Basra and Taşoz, together with Asar-i Tevfik, took part in the unsuccessful raid at Podima on the Black Sea coast, losing Asar-i Tevfik during the action.

=== World War I ===
At the outbreak of World War I, the destroyer was already obsolete and of low combat value. On 21 September 1914, the Basra and Taşoz escorted the battlecruiser Yavuz Sultan Selim on a patrol cruise in the Black Sea. On October 29, the Barbaros Hayreddin and Turgut Reis, escorted by Basra and Yarhisar, participated in securing the outing of the cruisers Berk-i Satvet and Midilli at Novorossiysk.

In 1915, her depleted engine room reduced her top speed to 17 knots, and the crew size increased to 91 men (17 Germans and 74 Turks). On 8 August 1915, the destroyer, together with the torpedo boat Sivrihisar, took part in the rescue of the crew of the Barbaros Hayreddin, sunk in the Dardanelles by the submarine HMS E11, avoiding a torpedo fired in her direction by it during a rescue operation of survivors. On October 18, near Bandırma, Basra and Yarhisar surprised HMS E12 on the surface, which, however, managed to escape.

Prior to the Gallipoli Campaign, Basra, together with her sister ships, escorted transports of Ottoman troops organized to reinforce the forces defending the Dardanelles.

On 14–15 September 1916, five destroyers (including the Basra and Samsun) escorted the freighter SS Patmos, which was transporting coal from Zonguldak. However, the ship struck a mine near Karaburun and was beached; (Note: It would subsequently be refloated and repaired, and in 1917 placed anew into service with the Germans.) its crew was taken off board by Basra and Samsun.

On 23–25 June 1917, the cruiser Midilli made a combat cruise in the Black Sea, laying, among other things, 70 mines at the mouth of the Danube. Returning to the Bosporus, the ship was fired upon by the Russian battleship Imperatritsa Ekaterina Velikaya and the destroyer Gnevny and in the last phase of the battle it was covered by Basra and the German submarine UC-23.

On 20 January 1918, the destroyers Basra, Samsun, Numûne-i Hamiyet and Muavenet-i Milliye took part in securing the outing of the Yavuz Sultan Selim and Midilli at the Battle of Imbros, among other things, covering the return to the Dardanelles of the mine-damaged Yavuz Sultan Selim. During the battle, Basra came under fire from the British destroyers Lizard and Tigress as a result of which she sustained damage to the stern and, after screening her own retreat, arrived in waters controlled by friendly coastal artillery. On March 30, the Basra, Samsun and Taşoz escorted the troop transport Patmos, carrying soldiers from Constanta to Odessa. In October, the ship was put back in reserve in Istanbul.

After the end of the war, on 29 October 1923, Basra was formally incorporated into the newly formed Turkish Navy, although her technical condition did not allow her to operate. In 1924–1925, the vessel underwent an overhaul at Deniz Fabrikaları in Istanbul, and after its completion, she entered active service. The ship was decommissioned in 1932, following the purchase of new destroyers from Italy. The destroyer was scrapped as late as 1949 in Gölcük.
