= Greek ship Sfendoni =

At least two ships of the Hellenic Navy have borne the name Sfendoni (Greek: Σφενδόνη, "Sling"):

- Greek destroyer Sfendoni (1907) a Thyella-class destroyer launched in 1907 and decommissioned in 1945.
- Greek destroyer Sfendoni (D85) a Fletcher-class destroyer launched in 1942 as USS Aulick transferred to Greece in 1959 and renamed. She was scrapped in 1997.
