= Greek ship Nafkratousa =

At least three ships of the Hellenic Navy have borne the name Nafkratousa (Greek: Ναυκρατούσα, "She who rules the sea with her ships"):

- Greek destroyer Nafkratousa a Thyella-class destroyer launched in 1906 and lost in 1921.
- Greek dock landing ship Nafkratousa (1953) a Casa Grande-class dock landing ship launched in 1943 as HMS Battleaxe but renamed HMS Eastway before completion, returned to US control in 1946 and transferred to Greece in 1953. She was scrapped after 1972.
- Greek dock landing ship Nafkratousa (1971) a Casa Grande-class dock landing ship launched in 1945 as USS Fort Mandan transferred to Greece in 1971 and renamed. She was scrapped in 2001.
