= Greek ship Thyella =

At least two ships of the Hellenic Navy have borne the name Thyella (Greek: Θύελλα, "Storm"):

- Greek destroyer Thyella (1907), a Thyella-class destroyer launched in 1907 and sunk in 1941.
- Greek destroyer Thyella (D28), a Fletcher-class destroyer launched in 1942 as USS Bradford transferred to Greece in 1962 and renamed. She was scrapped in 1981.
