= Greek ship Lonchi =

At least two ships of the Hellenic Navy have borne the name Lonchi (Greek: Λόγχη, "lance"):

- Greek destroyer Lonchi (1907) a Thyella-class destroyer launched in 1907 and scrapped in 1931.
- Greek destroyer Lonchi (D56) a Fletcher-class destroyer launched in 1942 as USS Hall transferred to Greece in 1960 and renamed. She was scrapped in 1997.
