= Greek destroyer Lonchi (1907) =

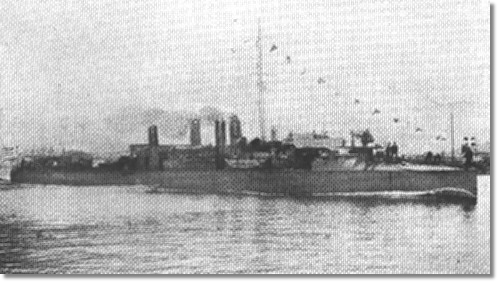
- Lonchi - Α/Τ Λόγχη

History

Greece
- Name: Lonchi
- Namesake: Spear
- Ordered: 1905
- Builder: Yarrow Shipbuilders, Cubitt Town, London
- Laid down: 1905
- Launched: July 7, 1907
- Commissioned: 1907
- Decommissioned: 1926
- Fate: Broken up in 1931

General characteristics
- Class & type: Thyella class destroyer
- Displacement: Standard 350 long tons (360 t)
- Length: 67.1 m (220 ft)
- Beam: 6.2 m (20 ft)
- Draft: 1.8 m (5 ft 11 in)
- Installed power: 6,000 hp (4,500 kW)
- Propulsion: 2 shafts
- Speed: 30-knot (56 km/h) maximum
- Complement: 70
- Armament: 2 × 76 mm (3.0 in) Hotchkiss guns; 4 × 57 mm (2.2 in) Hotchkiss guns; 2 × 18 in (460 mm) torpedo tubes

Lonchi (Greek: Α/Τ Λόγχη, "Spear") was a Thyella class destroyer that served in the Royal Hellenic Navy beginning in 1907. The ship, along with her three sister ships, was ordered from England in 1906 and was built in the Yarrow shipyard at Cubitt Town, London. Lonchi was 220 feet (67 m), displaced 352 metric tons (346 long tons; 388 short tons), and was armed with two 18 in (46 cm) torpedo tubes, two 76 mm (3.0 in) guns, and two 57 mm (2.2 in) guns.

Lonchi saw active service during the Balkan Wars, as part of the invasion fleet that seized several islands in the Aegean Sea in the first week of the war. For the remainder of the conflict, Lonchi participated in the naval blockade of the Dardanelles. During World War I, Greece belatedly entered the war on the side of the Triple Entente and, due to Greece's neutrality the four Thyella class ships were seized by the Allies in October 1916, taken over by the French in November and served in the French Navy 1917–1918. By 1918, they were back on escort duty under Greek colors, mainly in the Aegean Sea. Lonchi saw action in the Greco-Turkish War (1919–1922). After the war, she was stricken in 1926 and broken up in 1931.

== Construction ==
Lonchi was ordered from Yarrow shipyard at Cubitt Town, London in 1905, along with three sister ships, Thyella, Nafkratousa, and Sfendoni. Lonchi was launched on 10 July 1907. The ship was 220 feet (67 m) long and had a beam of 20 ft 6 in (6.25 m) and a draft of 6 ft (1.8 m). At normal displacement, Lonchi displaced 352 metric tons (346 long tons; 388 short tons), and at full combat load her displacement rose to 380 t (370 long tons; 420 short tons). The ship was powered by a pair of vertical triple expansion engines supplied with steam by four Yarrow water-tube coal-burning boilers. The power plant had a designed output of 6,000 indicated horsepower (4,500 kW) and a top speed of 30 knots (56 km/h; 35 mph), but on trials, the four ships averaged between 6,263 ihp (4,670 kW) and 6,524 ihp (4,865 kW) and speeds of 31.8 to 32.4 kn (58.9 to 60.0 km/h; 36.6 to 37.3 mph).

Lonchi was armed with a variety of weapons. Her primary offensive armament was a pair of 18 in (46 cm) torpedo tubes in two revolving, above-water mounts emplaced on her stern. She was also equipped with a light gun armament consisting of a pair of 76 mm (3.0 in) Hotchkiss guns and a pair of 57 mm (2.2 in) Hotchkiss guns.

== Service history ==
The First Balkan War, pitting the decaying Ottoman Empire against Greece, Serbia, and Bulgaria, broke out on 19 October 1912. The Greek Navy quickly gained superiority in the Aegean; on the day before hostilities began, the main Greek naval force, including the powerful armored cruiser Georgios Averof, the three elderly Hydra-class battleships, and fourteen destroyers including Lonchi, departed from Piraeus and landed troops at Mudros Bay on the 20th. The island was firmly in Greek control by the next day, after which the naval force conducted a series of amphibious assaults throughout the Aegean, capturing Thasos, Samothrace, Imbros, and Tenedos in the span of several days. Following the seizure of the Aegean islands, the Greek Navy conducted a blockade of the Dardanelles, which effectively kept the Ottoman Navy bottled up for the remainder of the war.

At the outbreak of World War I in 1914, Greece's monarch, Constantine I, decided to remain neutral. The Entente powers landed troops in Salonika in 1915, which was a source of tension between France and Greece. Ultimately, the French seized the Greek Navy on 19 October 1916. The Greek light forces, including Lonchi, were incorporated into the French Navy and flew the French naval ensign. Constantine I refused to accept an agreement with the Entente, and was forced to abdicate. His son, Alexander of Greece, was installed as king and acceded to Entente demands and declared war on the Central Powers on 2 July 1917. Lonchi, however, remained in French service through 1918.

After the end of World War I and the defeat of the Ottoman Empire, Greece moved to seize Ottoman holdings in the Aegean and Asia Minor. The entire Greek Navy, including Lonchi, was pushed into heavy service patrolling the eastern Mediterranean and in support of land operations. Operations came to a close in September 1922 when the Greek Army was forced to evacuate by sea, along with a sizable number of civilians, from Asia Minor. The fleet transported a total of 250,000 soldiers and civilians during the evacuation. By 1926, Lonchi was in bad condition and she was stricken from the naval register. The ship was finally broken up for scrap in 1931.
