= Bombardment of Samsun =

1922 Greek naval operation in Turkey

Coordinates: 41°17′25″N 36°20′01″E

- Part of the Turkish War of Independence
- Samsun view after the bombardment
Date	7 June 1922
Location	Samsun, Turkey
Result	See § Outcome

Belligerents
Greece	Ankara Government

Strength
1 battleship (Kilkis); 3 cruisers (Note: Including Georgios Averof); 2 destroyers (Note: Leon and Naxos); 4 minesweepers	1 artillery piece

Casualties and losses
No losses	4 soldiers killed, 3 wounded

On 7 June 1922, ships of the Greek Navy bombarded the Turkish town of Samsun for three hours (15:02–18:00), firing 400 rounds; while in response, the single Turkish artillery piece in the town fired back 25 rounds. While the American destroyers USS Sands, USS McFarland, and USS Sturtevant were present, they did not participate in the bombardment.

== Causes ==
There were several reasons for the bombardment. One of them was to assist Pontic Greek guerrillas who were fighting Turkish forces in the area. The bombardment was also seen as an act of retaliation against the ongoing Pontic Greek genocide. In 10 June 1922, the Greek newspaper Empros wrote the following, in regards to the bombardment: "Greece... cannot stay anymore just a spectator with folded hands of its slaughtered children, who ask for help from their Mother [i.e. Greece] with their lifeless voice..."

Another reason was to disrupt the consignment of weapons and ammunition into inner Anatolia. Moreover, Turkish sailing boats were seizing Greek ships in the Black Sea and putting them into Turkish service. Recently, a large Greek ship named Enosis had been taken over by one Turkish officer and five soldiers on 25 April 1922.

== Outcome ==
In the end, the attack did not cause a lot of damage to the Turkish logistical system or military material, though four soldiers were killed. The ships stayed in Samsun until being recalled to Allied-controlled Constantinople. Around 8 pm, US Navy Admiral Robert L. Ghormley went ashore, accompanied by a pharmacist, to see if any Americans were injured or dead.

The New York Times reported the incident on 11 June 1922, stating that the Greeks claimed the firing was directed against the ammunition dumps. The newspaper further mentioned that few people died and the warehouse of the American Tobacco Company was slightly damaged. The Times published another article about the incident on 12 June. The article said that the commander of an American torpedo boat destroyer at Samsun reported, contrary to the Greek report, that there were 90 casualties as a result of the bombardment and a portion of the town was destroyed. The ammunition depots belonging to the Turks, which were situated three miles inland, were not damaged.

== Bibliography ==
- Hulki Cevizoğlu, 1919'un Şifresi (Gizli ABD İşgalinin Belge ve Fotoğrafları), Ceviz Kabuğu Yayınları, Aralık 2007, ISBN 9789756613238. (in Turkish)
- Doğanay, Rahmi; İstiklal Harbinde Samsun’daki Amerikan Filosu, Geçmişten Geleceğe Samsun, Samsun 2006, (pages 163-174). (in Turkish)
