= Yarrow Admiralty Research Department =

Marine engine research organisation in the UK

- Formation: 1946; 80 years ago
- Legal status: Subsidiary of BAE Systems
- Region served: UK

The Yarrow Admiralty Research Department (YARD) was a private research consultancy. Working in close conjunction with the Admiralty of the Royal Navy, it helped to develop new propulsion systems at the behest of the that were used on Royal Navy frigates.

During the late 1960s, YARD was reorganised as a subsidiary of Yarrow Shipbuilders. It subsequently was acquired by BAeSEMA during 1991, and became a wholly-owned subsidiary of BAE Systems at the end of that same decade.

== History ==
The Yarrow Admiralty Research Department (YARD) was created in the aftermath of the Second World War in response the Admiralty's efforts to encourage and advance research efforts into naval propulsion technology. In 1946, the Admiralty approached Yarrow Shipbuilders, promoting the prospects of cooperating with another company, English Electric, to research turbine operations at higher pressure and higher temperature. A small team was put together and briefly worked from a stately home in Rugby, Warwickshire before relocating to Yarrow's shipyard at Scotstoun in January 1948, where they continued to work on improvements for both steam turbine and gas turbine propulsion systems.

In 1949, English Electric's staff were withdrawn from YARD as to permit bids for marine turbine work packages; Yarrow also took steps to retain impartiality. Accordingly, YARD operated as a separate department of Yarrow and worked on a commercial basis as a design and consultancy organisation that frequently provided the Admiralty with technical advice on naval turbines as well as being responsible for the construction of prototype machinery. Eric Dott Hobson was appointed as YARD's general manager around this time.

During the early 1950s, the Admiralty requested YARD to formulate the propulsion installation design for a compact single-screw frigate, as well as specifications, diagrams, detailed design, and production of an experimental turbine apparatus rated for 30,000 shaft horsepower (22,000 kW) under the codename YEAD. Furthermore, YARD performed a design study of a combined steam and gas turbine (COSAG) arrangement using Associated Electrical Industries-sourced gas turbines; in 1954, the Admiralty ordered the design, production, and shore testing of such a unit. The COSAG propulsion was subsequently used on the Tribal-class frigate HMS Ashanti, and helped Yarrow become a leading producer of frigates for the Royal Navy.

By 1960, YARD employed sixty engineers and scientists. During 1969, it was reorganised as a wholly-owned subsidiary of Yarrow. In 1991, it was acquired by BAeSEMA (a consortium of the domestic defence firm British Aerospace (BAe) and the French company Sema Group). By this point, YARD was heavily involved in maritime software development, such as for the command and control systems used on naval frigates and submarines, as well as sonar detection apparatus.

In November 1998, BAe purchased Sema's 50 percent ownership in BAeSEMA in exchange for £77 million. Accordingly, YARD became a wholly-owned subsidiary. YARD Ltd was ultimately dissolved in November 2014.
