= Yarrow Shipbuilders =

Shipbuilding firm based in Glasgow, Scotland

Yarrow Shipbuilders Limited
- Type: Public company
- Industry: Shipbuilding
- Founded: 1865
- Fate: Merged with others to form British Shipbuilders (1977–1985)
- Successor: GEC Marconi Marine (YSL) (1985–1999); BAE Systems Marine (1999–2003); BAE Systems Naval Ships (2003–2006); BAE Systems Surface Fleet Solutions (2006–2008); BVT Surface Fleet (2008–2009); BAE Systems Surface Ships (2009–)
- Headquarters: Scotstoun, Glasgow, UK
- Key people: Sir Alfred Yarrow; Sir Harold Yarrow; Sir Eric Yarrow; Sir Arnold Weinstock; Sir Robert Easton; Murray Easton CBE
- Products: Naval ships Merchant ships Marine steam engines Marine engines Boilers
- Number of employees: Approximately 3,000
- Parent: Upper Clyde Shipbuilders (1968–1970); Yarrow & Co. Ltd. (1970–1977); British Shipbuilders (1977–1985); GEC Marconi (1985–1999); BAE Systems (1999–present)
- Subsidiaries: Coventry Ordnance Works (1905–1925)

Yarrow Shipbuilders Limited (YSL), often styled as simply Yarrows, was a major shipbuilding firm based in the Scotstoun district of Glasgow on the River Clyde. It is now part of BAE Systems Surface Ships, owned by BAE Systems, which has also operated the nearby Govan shipyard (formerly Fairfields) since 1999.

== History ==
=== Origins in London ===
The company was founded by Alfred Yarrow, later Sir Alfred Yarrow, 1st Baronet, in the year 1865 as Yarrow & Company, Limited. Originally it was based at Folly Wall, Poplar, then in 1898 as the company grew, Yarrow moved his shipyard to London Yard, Cubitt Town. Hundreds of steam launches, lake and river vessels, and eventually the Royal Navy's first destroyers, the Havock class, were built at Yarrow's London shipyards between 1869 and 1908. Yarrow was also a builder of boilers, and a type of water-tube boiler developed and patented by the company was known as the "Yarrow boiler", first used in a torpedo boat in 1887 and later used for a number of applications, from the propulsion plant of RMS Queen Mary to the LNER Class W1 locomotive. The diversification into boiler manufacturing, including large boilers for electricity generation, meant that the company survived the lean years for shipbuilding. Alfred Yarrow was an inventive naval engineer, and was responsible for a number of novel introductions into service which led to the development of increasingly fast warships. Ultimately in the Royal Navy and abroad it became known that a "Yarrow ship was a fast ship", with the company building the first naval vessel globally to exceed 30 knots and then, later, 40 knots. Sir Alfred Yarrow was knighted for services to the war effort in 1916. He was a notable benefactor to many charities.

=== Move to Glasgow ===
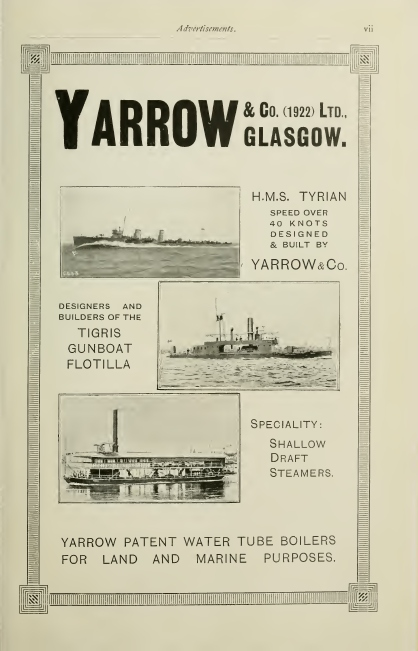
An advertisement for Yarrow & Co. Ltd. in the 1923 Brassey's Naval Annual, featuring the S-class destroyer HMS Tyrian and the Fly-class gunboat

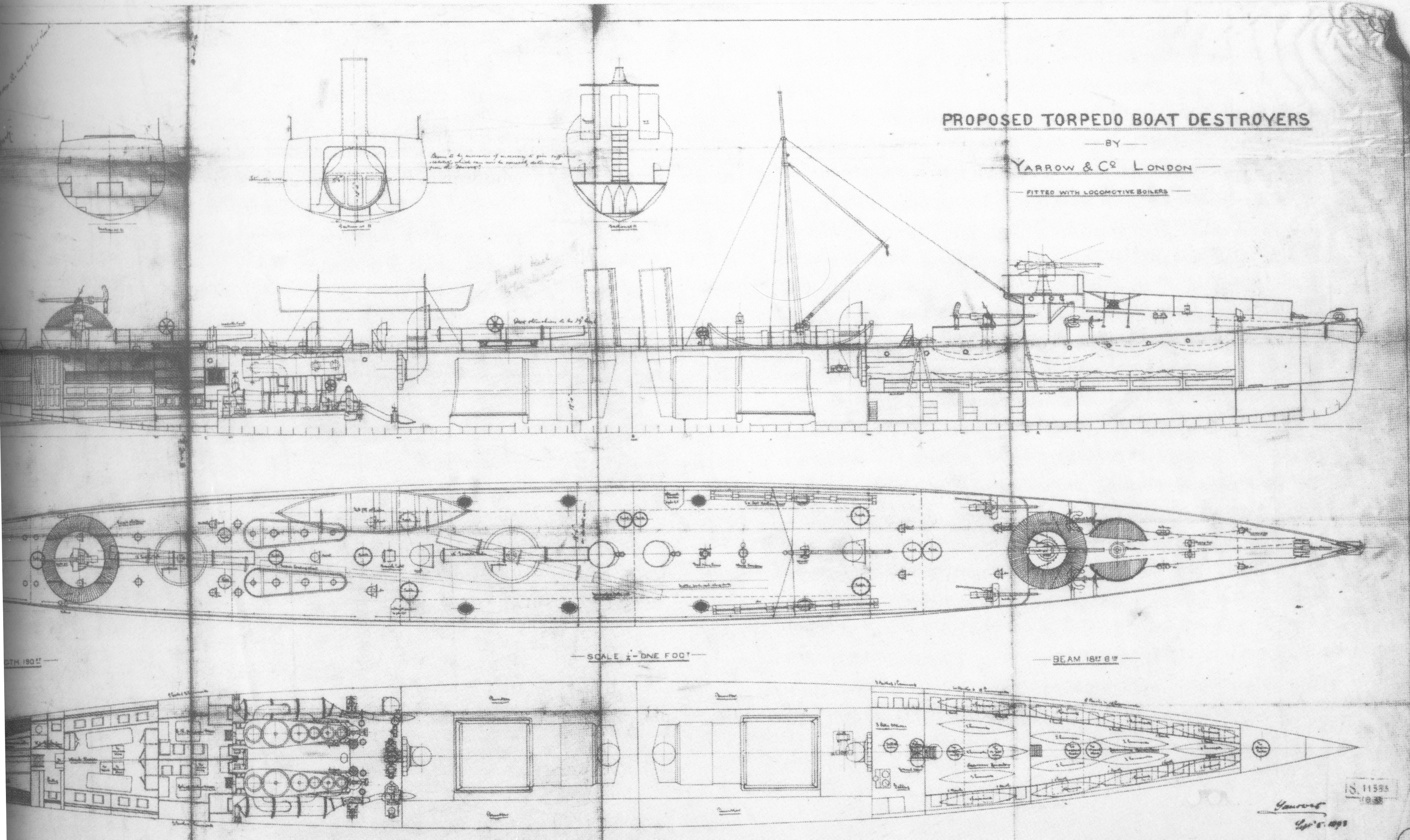
General arrangement of the Charger-class destroyers built by Yarrow & Co. at Poplar, London, 1894–95.

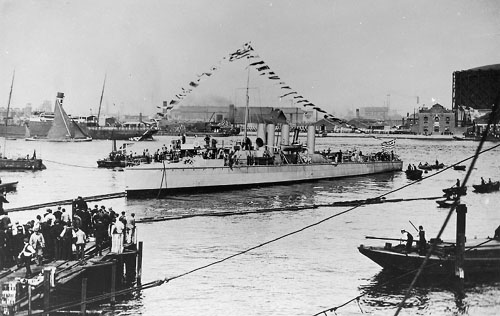
A Thyella-class destroyer for the Royal Hellenic Navy being launched at Yarrow's London Yard in Cubitt Town, 1906.

Despite a move of yards, Yarrows outgrew its London site and this and the cost of land and labour in London led to a second move to what was at that time a greenfield site at Scotstoun in the west of Glasgow, beginning in 1906. Between 4,000 and 5,000 tons of material had to be transported, from models to heavy machine tools. A train-load of from forty to fifty wagons left the works at Poplar every day. The first vessel launched from the new works at Scotstoun on 14 July 1908 was the lead ship of the Pará-class destroyers for the Brazilian Navy. Sir Harold Yarrow, eldest son of Sir Alfred, supervised the move to Scotland whilst still in his early twenties, and ran the company in Scotland. During the First World War, the company developed the pioneering Erskine artificial limb with Sir William Macewen and Sir Harold Yarrow was one of the founders of the Erskine Hospital for disabled ex-servicemen. Yarrow workshops were used to manufacture artificial limbs at no profit.

The Yarrow company was one of the world's leading builders of destroyers and frigates from early on, building ships for both the Royal Navy and numerous export customers. For many years until the 1960s Yarrow also built a large number of merchant ships, specialising particularly on Riverboat vessels for the rivers and lakes of Burma, India, Africa and South America.

Several of these vessels were built to serve on lakes that had no navigable access to deliver them by sea. They were therefore built as "knock downs"; that is, they were assembled temporarily in the shipyard, disassembled into a large number of sections and transported to the lake, and there assembled permanently and launched. Yarrow's Scotstoun yard built the "knock down" ferry Ilala for Nyasaland in 1949. She was completed and launched on Lake Nyasa (now Lake Malawi) in 1951. The yard built three "knock down" ferries for Lake Victoria in East Africa. RMS Victoria was built in Scotstoun in 1960 and reassembled at the Kenyan port of Kisumu on the lake in 1961. The train ferries Umoja and Uhuru were built in Scotstoun in 1965 and reassembled at Kisumu in 1965 and 1966.

In total Yarrow built approximately 400 ships on the Clyde – these can be traced in detail in the Clyde-built Ship Database.

The yard continued to expand during the post-war period, acquiring and integrating the shipyard of the neighbouring Blythswood Shipbuilding Company, which had itself been founded in 1919, to the east of the Yarrow yard in 1964. The new acquisition was used by Yarrow to extend their Shipyard, with the construction of three covered building berths and a six-storey Technical Office Block undertaken in the former Blythswood shipyard site during the late 1960s, with the aid of a government grant. Other neighbouring yards was acquired to lengthen the waterfront and provide additional facilities, the price of one being negotiated by Sir Eric Yarrow on the golf course with Sir John Hunter. Eric Yarrow had followed his father on his death as chairman in 1962, becoming the third generation of the family to lead the firm.

During this period, Yarrow was involved in designing and building many of the Royal Navy's post-war escort fleet; including the Type 81 Tribal class, Type 14 Blackwood class and the Type 12M Rothesay-class frigates. The company was also involved in the Leander class programme. During the 1960s ships were built for the navies of South Africa, Chile, Malaysia, Thailand, New Zealand and Iran.

=== Upper Clyde Shipbuilders and aftermath ===
In 1968 the Company became part of Upper Clyde Shipbuilders which collapsed in 1971. Yarrows had already left the UCS joint venture by April 1970 however, as the only profitable division of the joint venture. In 1974 it acquired the neighbouring Elderslie Dockyard, owned by Barclay Curle, which lay to the west of the Yarrow yard and included an extensive complex of three drydocks originally built in 1904 (No. 1 Dry Dock), 1933 (No. 2 Dry Dock) and 1965 (No. 3 Dry Dock). During this period Yarrow was involved in the Type 12I Leander-class frigate programme as well as the Condell-class frigate for the Chilean Navy and the design of the Nilgiri-class frigate for the Indian Navy.

The long-term investment in facilities and strong manufacturing credentials, combined with the development of the Yarrow-Admiralty Research Department (Y-ARD) from 1946 ensured that when the number of warship yards was dramatically reduced by the Navy in the 1970s, Yarrows was chosen as one of mainstream contractors alongside Swan Hunter, Vosper (for the Type 21s) and Cammell Laird. The Yarrow Admiralty Research Department (YARD) relocated to the new Charing Cross Tower in central Glasgow in 1976. The Type 21 frigate was the first type in the Navy to be a combined Gas Turbine and Diesel design, using the marine variant of the Rolls-Royce Olympus gas turbine (also used in Concorde). 5 out of 8 Type 21s, 10 out of 14 Type 22s, 12 out of 16 Type 23s and all the Type 45s were built at Scotstoun, demonstrating the firm's dominance in the market for medium-sized RN surface vessels. The sleek, good looks and the sporting performance of the Type 21 frigates led to the captains of the ships being called "boy racers". The vessel could stop from full speed in twice the length of the ship. HMS Ardent was destroyed by Argentinian aircraft in Falkland Sound in May 1982. All of the Yarrow built Type 21s served in the Falklands

=== Nationalisation ===
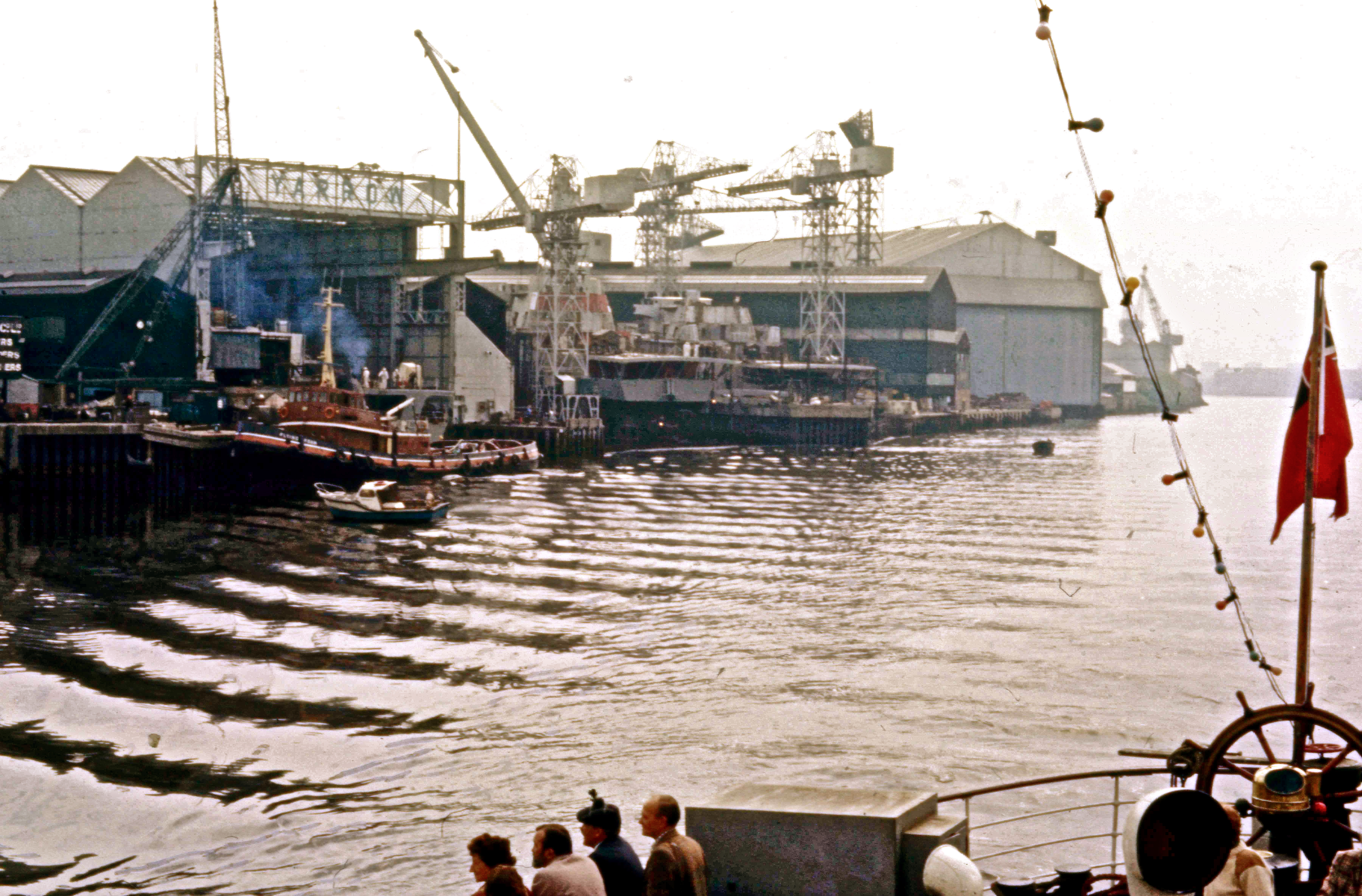
June 1979 Polish ships under construction.

In 1977 the Labour government of James Callaghan passed the Aircraft and Shipbuilding Industries Act 1977 which nationalised Yarrow (Shipbuilders), Limited, and grouped it with other major British shipyards as a division within British Shipbuilders. Nationalisation was opposed by the owners, and by the minority Conservative party. The last ship launched under private ownership was HMS Battleaxe (F89), a Type 22 launched by Audrey Callaghan, wife of the Prime Minister. Investment continued in the yard, with the construction of a large GRP fabrication hall at the western end of the yard, adjacent to the Elderslie dry docks during the late 1970s. Dry dock No.1 was also covered over. This was in preparation for the Hunt-class mine countermeasures vessel project, although only two vessels of the class were eventually built at Yarrow. The long-disused hall was subsequently demolished in 2008. The parent company, Yarrow plc, retained ownership of non-shipbuilding assets, including YARD Ltd. Yarrow plc was subsequently sold to CAP Group in 1986, which in turn became Sema Group plc in 1988, which then put its YARD subsidiary into the BAeSEMA joint venture with British Aerospace in 1991.

=== Privatisation ===
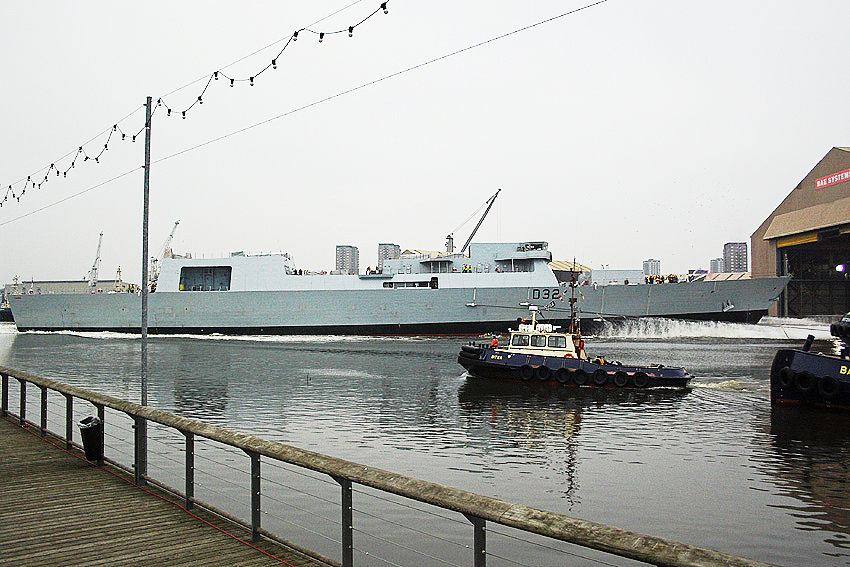
Launch of HMS Daring, a Type 45 destroyer from the former YSL yard, now BAE Systems in 2006.

The succeeding government of Margaret Thatcher began a privatisation programme and the profitable Yarrow was one of British Shipbuilders' early divestitures. It was sold in 1985 to GEC's GEC-Marconi division, becoming Marconi Marine (YSL). GEC began a programme of major capital investment, culminating in the construction of a large Module Hall, north of the covered building berths, in 1987. The principal work undertaken during this period was on the Type 22 Broadsword class and Type 23 Duke class frigates for the Royal Navy and the Lekiu-class frigate for the Royal Malaysian Navy as well as the Type 45 Destroyers for the Royal Navy. In 1999 Marconi Electronic Systems was sold to British Aerospace, creating BAE Systems. Marconi Marine (YSL) then became part of BAE Systems Marine. Since 2009, YSL is part of BAE Systems Surface Ships, a BAE Systems subsidiary.

== Ships built by Yarrow Shipbuilders ==
Built in London
- NMS Rândunica
- Colo Colo class spar torpedo boats
  - Colo Colo
  - Tucapel
- Șoimul-class spar torpedo boats
  - NMS Șoimul
  - NMS Vulturul
- SS Ilala 1875
- Kotaka 1885
- Havock-class destroyers
  - HMS Havock 1893
  - HMS Hornet 1893
  - PS Manuwai 1894
- Corrientes-class torpedo boat destroyers - derivative of Havock-Class destroyers
  - ARA Entre Rios (1896)
  - ARA Santa Fe (1896)
  - ARA Corrientes (1897)
  - ARA Misiones (1897)
- Waione – 1898? – scrapped in the 1960s
- Ohura – 1898? – wrecked and later scrapped
- Ikazuchi-class destroyers, Imperial Japanese Navy
  - Ikazuchi 1898
  - Inazuma 1899
  - Niji 1899
  - Akebono 1899
  - Oboro 1899
  - Sazanami 1899
- PS Aotea (later renamed PS Waimarie) 1899 – restored and operating in Wanganui, New Zealand
- Akatsuki-class destroyers, Imperial Japanese Navy
  - Akatsuki 1901, sunk 1904
  - Kasumi 1902, scrapped 1920s
- Tarantula 1902, the World's first turbine-powered steam yacht
- Ongarue – 1903 – awaiting restoration, Wanganui
- Wairua − 1904 – restored and operating in Wanganui
- Waiora – 1904 – sunk on the river in Wanganui
- River-class destroyers
  - HMS Teviot 1903
  - HMS Usk 1903
  - HMS Ribble 1904
  - HMS Welland 1904
  - HMS Gala 1905
  - HMS Garry 1905
- Thyella-class destroyers (Royal Hellenic Navy)
  - Nafkratousa 1906
  - Thyella 1907
  - Lonchi 1907
  - Sfendoni 1907
Built in Glasgow
- Pará-class destroyers
- Black Swan-class sloop
  - HMS Wild Goose
  - HMS Flamingo
  - HMS Black Swan
  - HMS Whimbrel
- Weapon-class destroyers
  - HMS Battleaxe
  - HMS Broadsword
- Daring-class destroyers
  - HMS Decoy
  - HMS Diana
- Lake Malawi ferry
  - Ilala 1949
- Tribal-class frigate
  - HMS Ashanti
- Lake Victoria ferries
  - RMS Victoria 1960
  - Uhuru 1965
  - Umoja 1965
- Hecla-class survey vessel
  - HMS Hecla 1964
  - HMS Hecate (A137) 1965
  - HMS Hydra 1965
  - SAS Protea 1971
- Leander-class frigate
  - HMS Apollo
  - HMS Ariadne
  - HMS Dido
  - HMS Diomede
  - HMS Hermione
  - HMS Jupiter
  - HMS Naiad
  - HMNZS Canterbury (F421)
  - BAE Morán Valverde (ex-HMS Danae, ex-Almirante Lynch (PFG-07))
  - BAE Eloy Alfaro (ex-Almirante Condell (PFG-06))
- Type 21 frigates
  - HMS Ambuscade
  - HMS Arrow
  - HMS Alacrity
  - HMS Ardent
  - HMS Avenger
- Type 22 frigates
  - HMS Broadsword
  - HMS Battleaxe
  - HMS Brilliant
  - HMS Brazen
  - HMS Boxer
  - HMS Beaver
  - HMS Brave
  - HMS London
  - HMS Cornwall
  - HMS Cumberland
- Type 23 frigates
  - HMS Norfolk
  - HMS Argyll
  - HMS Lancaster
  - HMS Iron Duke
  - HMS Monmouth
  - HMS Montrose
  - HMS Somerset
  - HMS Grafton
  - HMS Sutherland
  - HMS Kent
  - HMS Portland
  - HMS St Albans
- Type 45 destroyers
  - HMS Daring 2006
  - HMS Dauntless 2007
  - HMS Diamond 2007
  - HMS Dragon 2008
  - HMS Defender 2009
  - HMS Duncan 2010
- Converted Civilian Vessels
  - HMCS Tuna originally built as Tarantula

=== Clyde-class RNLI lifeboats ===
- Charles H Barrett (70-001)
- Grace Paterson Ritchie (70-002)

=== Royal Malaysian Navy ===
- KD Hang Tuah (F76) ex-Black Star, ex-HMS Mermaid
- KD Rahmat (F24)
- Lekiu-class frigates
  - KD Jebat (F29)
  - KD Lekiu (F30)

== Yarrows Ltd. (Canada) ==
Yarrows Ltd. was a major ship yard located in Esquimalt, British Columbia on the south coast of Vancouver Island, Canada. Established in 1893 as the Esquimalt Marine Railway Co., later B.C. Marine Railway Co., by W. Fitzherbert Bullen, it ran small marine railways in Victoria and Vancouver. Sir Alfred Yarrow purchased the yard in 1913, renamed it Yarrows Ltd., and installed his son, Norman Yarrow, as manager . From its early start building ships for the Canadian Pacific Railway, the yard expanded during the First World War to repair and refit many vessels for the Royal Navy, employing up to 800 men. In the late 1920s, the larger Esquimalt graving dock was completed. During the Second World War the company produced corvettes, frigates, landing ships, and transport ferries for the Royal Navy and Royal Canadian Navy, as well as freighters. Other work included arming civilian ships and refitting at least one as a troop carrier. At its peak, 3,500 men and women worked for Yarrows in the yard. After the war, the Yarrow family sold the yard to Burrard Dry Dock, with the deal completed on April 15, 1946. The yard was closed in 1994 and the graving dock and property are now part of the Canadian Forces Base Esquimalt.

The follow ships were built by the Canadian Yarrows company:

- Ferries (note: ships without hull numbers were built for another company before BC Ferries).
  - Hull Unknown Pender Queen 1923 Built as Motor Princess and served the Canadian Pacific Railway.
  - Hull Unknown Salt Spring Queen 1949 Built as Delta Princess and crossed the Fraser River where the George Massey Tunnel is now.
  - Hull Unknown Kwuna 1975
  - Hull 371 Queen of Cowichan 1976
  - Hull 550 Queen of Oak Bay 1981
  - Spirit of British Columbia 1993
  - Spirit of Vancouver Island 1994
- Warships
  - River-class frigates for the Royal Canadian Navy (16 vessels) – 1942–1944
  - Flower-class corvettes for the Royal Canadian Navy (5 vessels) – 1940–1941
    - HMCS Alberni (K103) 1940
    - HMCS Nanaimo (K101) 1940
    - HMCS Edmundston (K106) 1941
    - HMCS Timmins (K223) 1941
    - HMCS Vancouver (K240) 1941
  - Landing craft
- Converted civilian vessels
  - Auxiliary cruiser Rajputana 1939
  - RMS Empress of Russia
  - RMS Empress of Japan
  - RMS Empress of Asia
  - RMS Empress of Canada
  - CCGS Tanu
  - CCGS Vector
