= Greek destroyer Thyella (1907) =

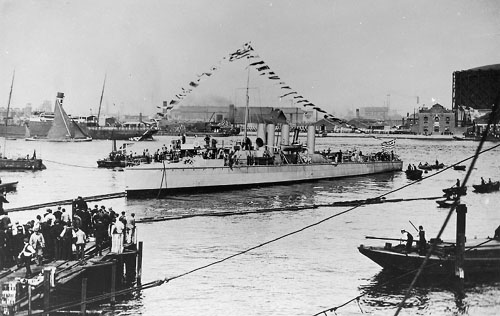
- Thyella at her launch at Yarrows

History

Greece
- Namesake: Storm
- Ordered: 1905
- Builder: Yarrow Shipbuilders, Cubitt Town, London
- Laid down: 1905
- Launched: 1907
- Commissioned: 1907
- Decommissioned: 1941
- Fate: Sunk by the Luftwaffe on April 21, 1941

General characteristics
- Class & type: Thyella class destroyer
- Displacement: Standard 350 tons
- Length: 67.1 m (220 ft)
- Beam: 6.2 m (20 ft)
- Draft: 1.8 m (5 ft 11 in)
- Propulsion: 2 shafts, 6,000 hp
- Speed: 30-knot (56 km/h) maximum
- Complement: 70
- Armament: Gun 2 × 3-inch (76 mm) 12-pounder Hotchkiss Single & Gun 4 × 57-millimetre (2 in) 6-pounder 40cal Hotchkiss QF Single

Thyella (Greek: Α/Τ Θύελλα, "Storm") was a Thyella class destroyer that served in the Royal Hellenic Navy (1907-1941). It was the first ship of that name in the Hellenic Navy.

The ship, along with her three sister ships, was ordered from Britain in 1905 and was built in the Yarrow shipyard at Cubitt Town, London.

During World War I, Greece belatedly entered the war on the side of the Triple Entente and, due to Greece's neutrality the four Thyella class ships were seized by the Allies in October 1916, taken over by the French in November and served in the French Navy 1917–18. By 1918, they were back on escort duty under Greek colors, mainly in the Aegean Sea. Thyella saw action in the Greco-Turkish War (1919-1922).

In World War II, Thyella saw action and was sunk during the German invasion on April 21, 1941, off Vouliagmeni near Athens.

== See also ==
- History of the Hellenic Navy
