= Greek destroyer Nafkratousa =

- Nafkratousa

History

Greece
- Name: Nafkratousa
- Ordered: 1905
- Builder: Yarrow Shipbuilders, Cubitt Town, London
- Laid down: 1905
- Launched: 1906
- Commissioned: 1906
- Decommissioned: 1921
- Fate: Wrecked, March 1921

General characteristics
- Class & type: Thyella class destroyer
- Displacement: Standard 350 long tons (360 t)
- Length: 67.1 m (220 ft)
- Beam: 6.2 m (20 ft)
- Draft: 1.8 m (5 ft 11 in)
- Installed power: 6,000 hp (4,500 kW)
- Propulsion: 2 shafts;
- Speed: 30 knots (56 km/h; 35 mph)
- Complement: 70
- Armament: 2 × single 3 in (7.6 cm) 12 pdr gun; 4 × single 57 mm (2.2 in) 6 pdr Hotchkiss gun

Nafkratousa (Greek: Ναυκρατούσα) was a Thyella-class destroyer built for the Royal Hellenic Navy during the first decade of the 20th century.

The ship, along with her three sister ships, was ordered from Britain in 1905 and was built in the Yarrow shipyard at Cubitt Town, London.

During World War I, Greece belatedly entered the war on the side of the Triple Entente and, due to Greece's neutrality the four Thyella class ships were seized by the Allies in October 1916, taken over by the French in November and served in the French Navy 1917–18. By 1918, they were back on escort duty under Greek colors, mainly in the Aegean Sea. Nafkratousa saw action in the Greco-Turkish War (1919-1922). Nafkratousa ran aground on the island of Milos during March 1921 and was wrecked.

== Bibliography ==
- Mach, Andrzej V. (1985). "Greece". In Gray, Randal (ed.). Conway's All the World's Fighting Ships 1906–1921. Annapolis, Maryland: Naval Institute Press. pp. 382–387. ISBN 0-85177-245-5.

== See also ==
- History of the Hellenic Navy
- Yarrow Shipbuilders
