= Thyella-class destroyer =

- A silhouette of a Thyella-class destroyer

Class overview
- Name: Thyella class
- Builders: Yarrow Shipbuilders, Cubitt Town, London
- Succeeded by: Aetos class
- Completed: 4
- Retired: 4

General characteristics
- Type: Destroyer
- Displacement: 350 tonnes
- Length: 67.1 m (220.1 ft)
- Beam: 6.2 m (20.3 ft)
- Draught: 1.8 m (5.9 ft)
- Speed: 30 kn (56 km/h; 35 mph)
- Armament: 2 × 12-pounder (76 mm) guns; 4 × 6-pounder (57 mm) guns; 2 × 457 mm (18 in) torpedo tubes

The Thyella class of destroyers were ordered by the Royal Hellenic Navy before World War I, when the Greek government embarked on a naval buildup after losing the Greco-Turkish War of 1897. These four ships were ordered from Britain in 1905, and were among the last vessels built at the Yarrow shipyard at Cubitt Town, London, before its move to the Clyde.

The class consisted of four destroyers: Lonchi, Nafkratousa, Sfendoni and Thyella.

== Ships in class ==
Ship	Laid down	Launched	Completed	Fate
Nafkratousa (Ναυκρατούσα)	1905	1906	1906	Run aground and wrecked on the island of Milos in March 1921
Thyella (Θύελλα, "Storm")	1905	1907	1907	Bombed and sunk by the Luftwaffe, 21 April 1941
Lonchi (Λόγχη, "Spear")	1905	1907	1907	Decommissioned in 1926 and broken up in 1931
Sfendoni (Σφενδόνη, "Sling")	1905	1907	1907	Decommissioned after 1945
