= Greek destroyer Sfendoni (1907) =

- Sfendoni – Α/Τ Σφενδόνη

History

Greece
- Name: Sfendoni
- Namesake: slingshot
- Ordered: 1905
- Builder: Yarrow Shipbuilders, Cubitt Town, London
- Laid down: 1905
- Launched: 1907
- Commissioned: 1907
- Decommissioned: 1945
- Fate: Decommissioned after World War II

General characteristics
- Class & type: Thyella class destroyer
- Displacement: Standard 350 tons
- Length: 67.1 m (220 ft)
- Beam: 6.2 m (20 ft)
- Draft: 1.8 m (5 ft 11 in)
- Propulsion: 2 shafts, 6,000 hp
- Speed: 30-knot (56 km/h) maximum
- Complement: 70
- Armament: Gun 2 × 3-inch (8 cm) 12-pounder Hotchkiss Single & Gun 4 × 57-millimetre (2 in) 6-pounder 40cal Hotchkiss QF Single

Sfendoni (Greek: Α/Τ Σφενδόνη, "Sling") was a Thyella class destroyer that served in the Royal Hellenic Navy (1907–1945). It was the second ship of that name in the Hellenic Navy, but the first destroyer-type vessel bearing the name.

The ship, along with her three sister ships, was ordered from Britain in 1905 and was built in the Yarrow shipyard at Cubitt Town, London.

During World War I, Greece belatedly entered the war on the side of the Triple Entente and, due to Greece's neutrality the four Thyella class ships were seized by the Allies in October 1916, taken over by the French in November and served in the French Navy 1917–18. By 1918, they were back on escort duty under Greek colors, mainly in the Aegean Sea. Sfendoni saw action in the Greco-Turkish War (1919-1922).

After the declaration of war by Italy in World War II, Sfendoni saw action in the area of North Ionian Sea and the strait of Otranto, executing escort missions for cargo ships carrying ammunition, fuel and food to Allied forces. In between escort missions, attack operations of limited scale were planned and executed without any losses to the Hellenic Navy. After the German invasion of Greece in April 1941, the Royal Hellenic Navy suffered serious losses, but Sfendoni evacuated with the remaining ships of the Greek fleet to Alexandria, Egypt and served under British command for the duration of the war. After the war, Sfendoni was decommissioned.

== See also ==
- History of the Hellenic Navy

== Bibliography ==
- Mach, Andrzej V. (1985). "Greece". In Gray, Randal (ed.). Conway's All the World's Fighting Ships 1906–1921. Annapolis, Maryland: Naval Institute Press. pp. 382–387. ISBN 0-85177-245-5.
