= French military mission to Greece =

French military mission to Greece may refer to one of the following French military missions to train the Greek military:

- Unofficial in 1828–1833, during the Morea expedition
- French military mission to Greece (1884–1887)
- French naval mission to Greece (1884–1890)
- French military mission to Greece (1911–1914)
- French military mission to Greece (1917–1923) under Antoine Gramat in World War I
- French military mission to Greece (1925–1932)

== See also ==
- British military mission to Greece (disambiguation)
