= Bomb, ground, 6 lb =

British World War II grenade

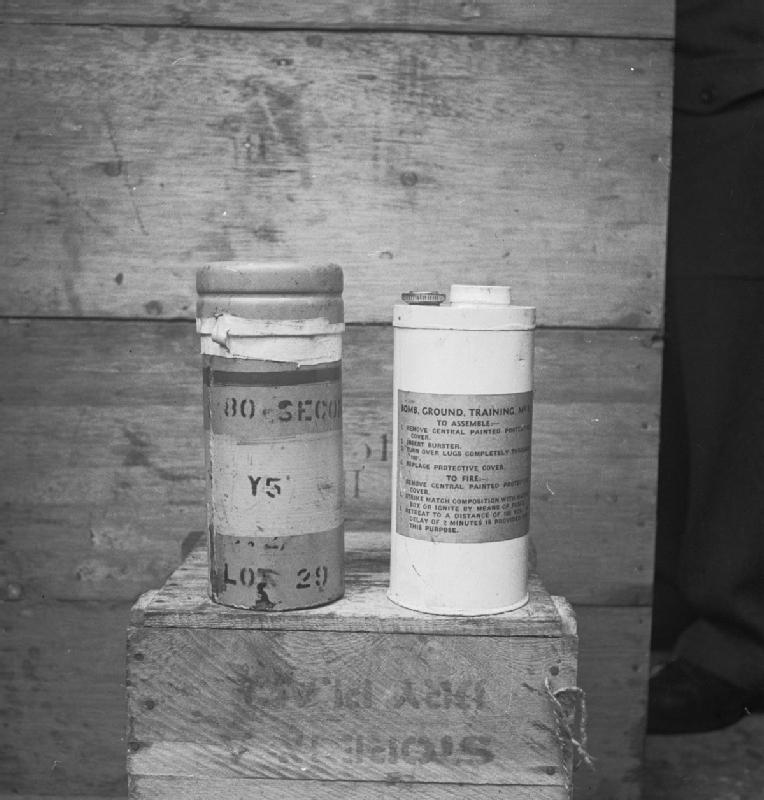
A bomb, ground, 6-pound (left) and an inert version used in training (right).

Bomb, Ground, 6 lb was a British World War II grenade containing about 2 pints (1.1 L) of mustard gas. It was intended to be used to contaminate trenches, dug-outs, rooms, observation posts and small enclosures, and on cross-roads, narrow defiles, obstacles and debris of demolition.

== Design ==
As described in the training instructions: "The bomb consists of a cylindrical steel container... 3-3/4 in. in diameter, 9 in. high, weighing 6 lb. [...] It holds 3½ lb. (about 2 pints) of mustard gas... The bomb is fitted with a metal lid 2in. deep which is a good push fit on the body. This lid is fastened to the body by adhesive tape. In the centre of the underside of the lid is a striker for use on the match composition head of the ejection charge. [...] At one end of the bomb is a screwed plug. This is the filling plug. In order that any leakage may be readily detected the plug is coated with detector paint. [...] the ejection charge... consists of about 1/7 oz. of gunpowder connected by 32 in. of safety fuze to the match composition head. This length of fuze gives a delay of two minutes. The safety fuze is coiled in concentric circles in a shallow metal saucer and is set in bakelite cement. [...] The ejection charge has therefore the appearance of a circular plate 3½ in. in diameter. On the lower side is a threaded boss closed by a tin plate disc. This boss screwes into the bomb, the gunpowder charge being just above the tin plate disc. On the upper side of the ejection charge in the centre there is a flatened projection used for screwing the ejection charge into the bomb. The charge is also housed in the projection. On the rim there is another smaller projection holding the match composition head. The ejection charge is designed to blow out the end of the bomb fitted with the filling plug."
