= Konstantinos Karageorgis =

Greek naval officer (born 1962)

- Born: 23 February 1962 (age 64); Athens, Greece
- Military career
- Allegiance: Greece
- Branch: Hellenic Navy
- Rank: Vice Admiral
- Unit: 1979 -
- Commands: Commander in Chief of the Hellenic Fleet; HS PANAGOPOULOS III

Vice Admiral Konstantinos Karageorgis (Greek: Κωνσταντίνος Καραγεώργης, born February 23, 1962) is a Greek naval officer, currently serving as Chief of the Fleet Command.

He joined the Navy in 1979 and qualified as a weapons officer.

He served as Commander of the Fast Patrol Boats Command, Deputy Commander of the Hellenic Naval Academy and Commander of the Logistic Support Command as well as of the Naval Training Command.

He was appointed Commander in Chief of the Hellenic Fleet in 2015.
