= François-Nicolas-Benoît Haxo =

French general

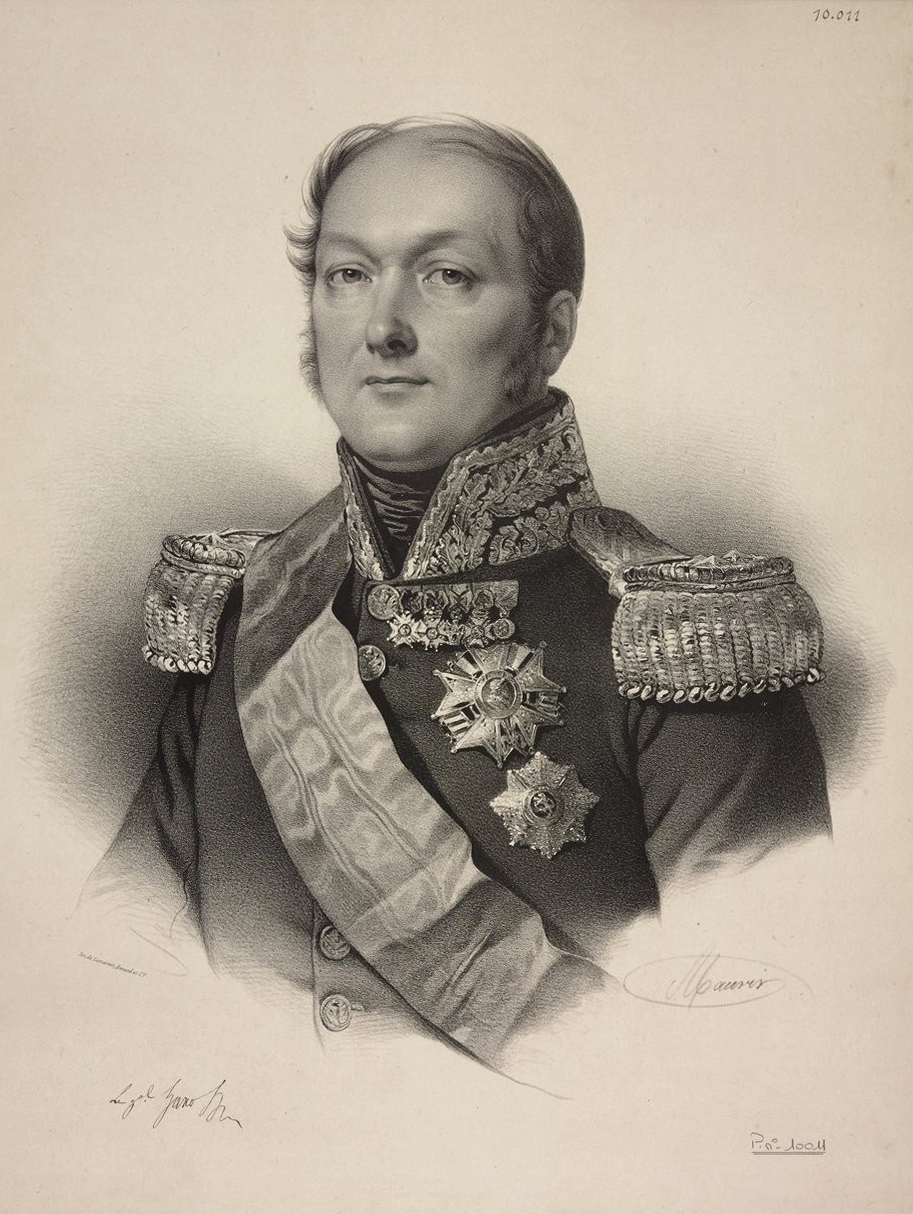

François Nicolas Benoît, Baron Haxo (French pronunciation: [fʁɑ̃swa nikɔlɑ bənwa akso]; 24 June 1774 – 25 June 1838) was a French Army general and military engineer during the French Revolution and First Empire. Haxo became famous in the Siege of Antwerp in 1832. He is the nephew of revolution era General Nicolas Haxo of Étival-Clairefontaine and Saint-Dié-des-Vosges in Lorraine, France.

== Biography ==
Haxo was born on 24 June 1774, in Lunéville, and began his career with the Military engineers (Génie Militaire) in 1793. Haxo embraced the military early in his career. He finished the School of Artillery and Engineers of Chalons-sur-Marne in 1793 with the rank of Lieutenant Minor. Soon after, Haxo earned the rank of Captain of Engineers in the Army of the Rhine in 1794. In 1796, he attended École Polytechnique.

In 1801, Haxo became a battalion commander following the capitulation of Fort Bard (1 June 1800) by the Army of Italy, part of the French military from 1792 to 1802.

Haxo has been called the Vauban of the nineteenth century given his work repairing and reinforcing various fortifications and citadels in the early 1800s. This work became necessary as a result of the development of more sophisticated artillery since the time of Vauban (1633–1707). For example, in Besançon in the late seventeenth century, guns did not have enough range to reach the citadel from the hills of Bregille and Chaudanne, whose peaks were higher. However, in the early nineteenth century, guns improved and artillery shelling became possible. Haxo built a fort on each of the two hills to prevent the enemy seizing them and using them for artillery shelling.

In 1807, Haxo was responsible for improving the defenses of Constantinople. He then went to Italy, to serve under General Chasseloup. In 1809, having been promoted to Major, he distinguished himself in the Siege of Zaragoza. Napoleon I then appointed him Colonel. Haxo took part in the Battle of Wagram, and then returned to the Iberian Peninsula to direct the siege operations of Louis-Gabriel Suchet's army in Catalonia and Valencia. In 1810, he was promoted to Brigadier General and gained the title of baron in 1811. In the same year, he helped to prepare the occupied fortresses of Germany against a possible Russian invasion.

In 1812, Haxo was chief engineer of Louis-Nicolas Davout's I Corps, and after the retreat from Moscow, was promoted to the rank of Division General. In 1813, in addition to commanding the Guard Engineers, he constructed the works around Hamburg, making defense of Davout's fortress possible. On 30 August, he was wounded and taken prisoner with General Dominique Vandamme during the Battle of Kulm.

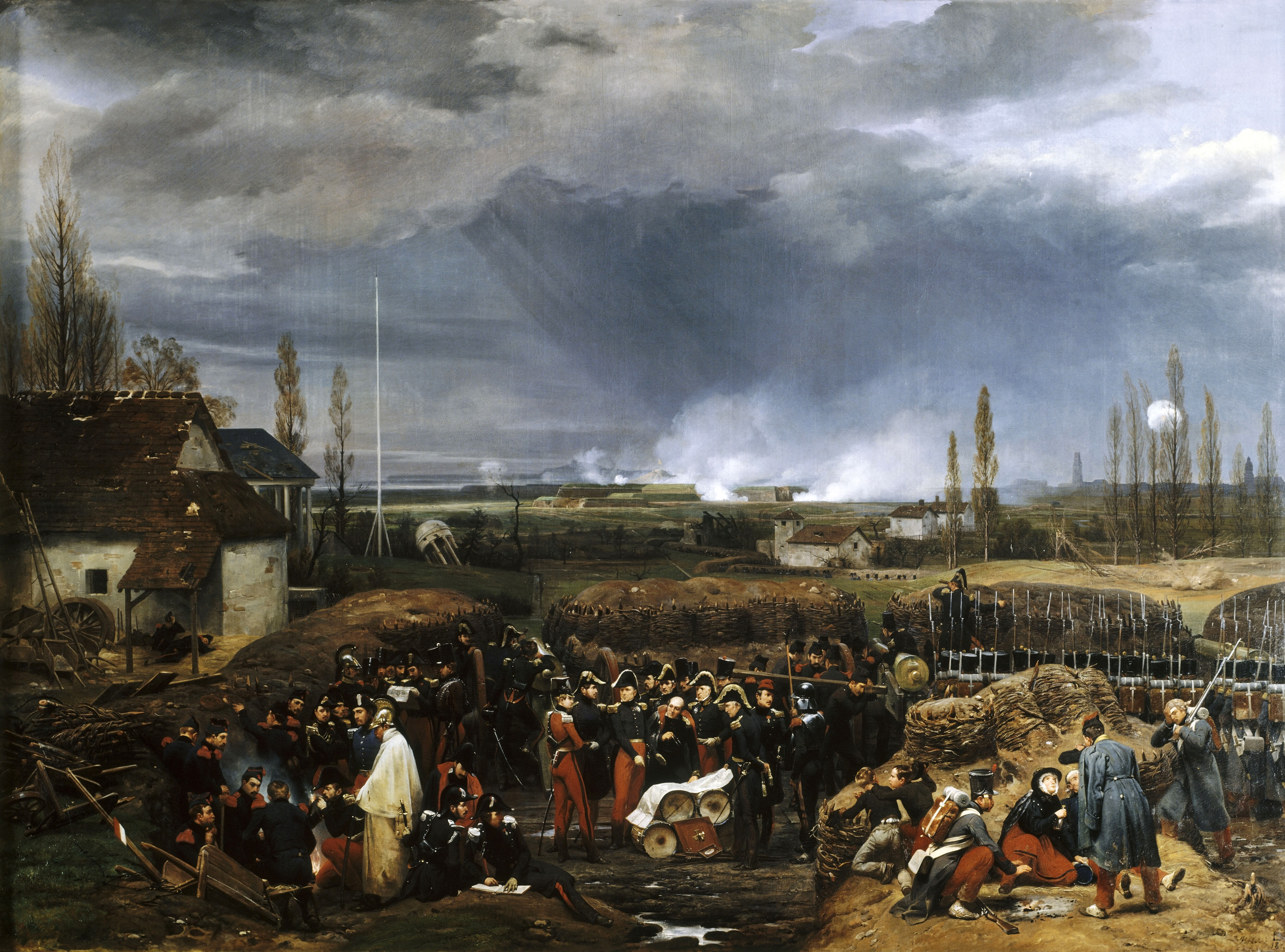
The Siege of Antwerp by Horace Vernet

After the Restoration, Louis XVIII wished to give Haxo a command in the Royal Guard, but the general remained faithful to Napoleon. During the Hundred Days, Haxo laid out the provisional fortifications of Paris and fought at the Battle of Waterloo.

It was after the Second Restoration that the best work of his career was accomplished. As Inspector General he managed to reconstruct the old Vauban and Cormontaigne fortresses, which had failed during the invasions of 1814 and 1815.

In 1815, Haxo was relieved from the military by the Restoration government. In 1819, however, he was reinstated as Inspector General of frontier fortifications (Grenoble, Besançon, Dunkirk, St. Omer, Sedan, the Fort Lock, Belfort, and Bitche).

Haxo was part of the Council of War called upon to judge General Charles Lefebvre-Desnouettes and voted for his death.

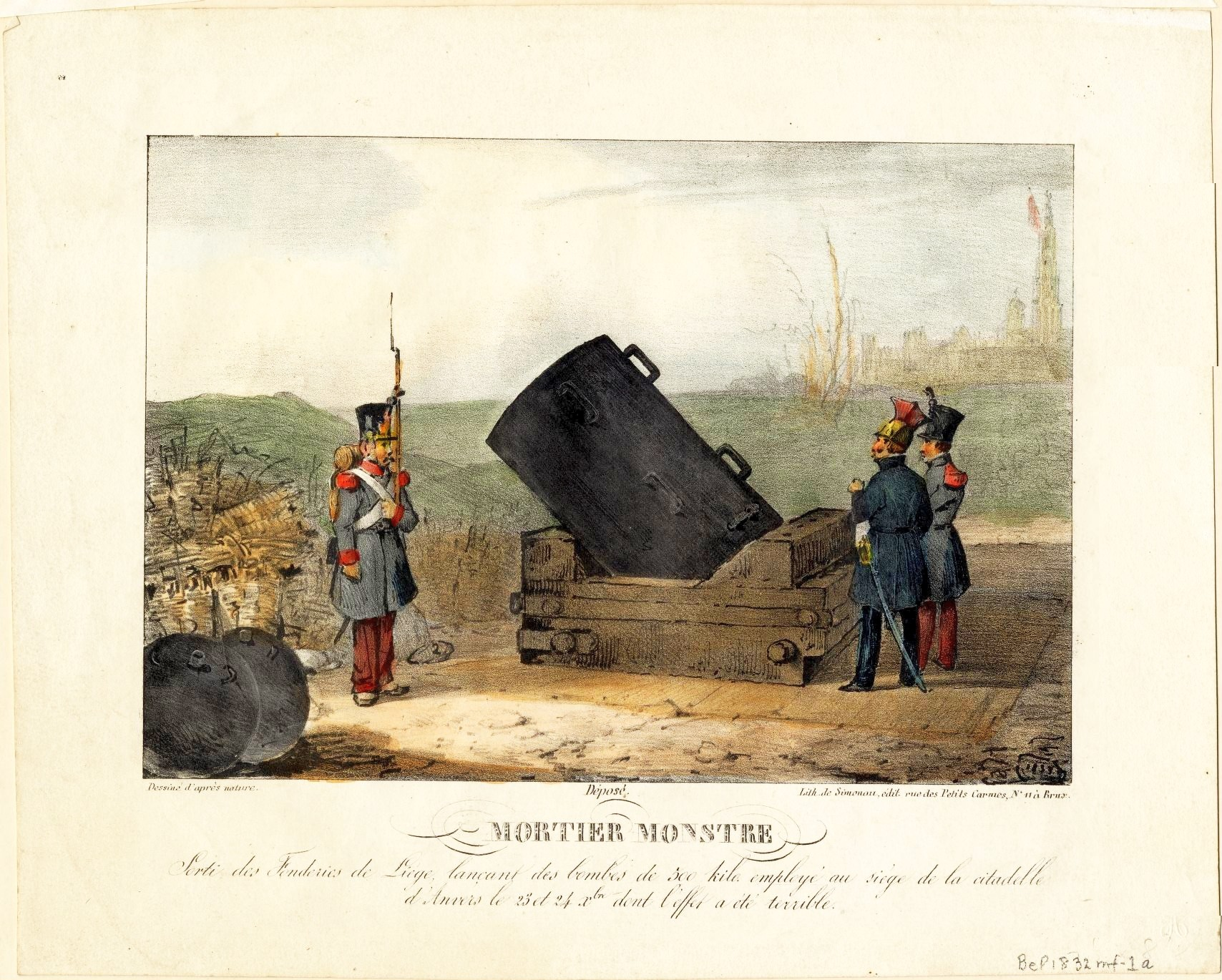
Monster Mortar used during the Siege of the citadel of Antwerp

Appointed Inspector General of the Royal Weapon and Grand Officer of the Legion of Honour, Louis Philippe I named him Peer of France in 1832 and presented him with the Grand Cross in 1833, as well as state counselor and member of the fortifications committee. During this time, Haxo voted against detached forts, instead supporting their continuous enclosure.

Soon after, Haxo was named Peer of France, the French intervention in Belgium began involving the Siege of Antwerp. Under Étienne Maurice Gérard, Haxo directed the besiegers and completely outmatched the opposing engineers. The fortress was forced to surrender after a siege of a little more than three weeks, ending on 23 December 1832.

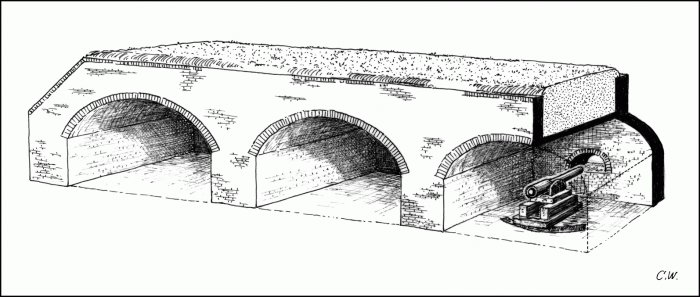
A 19th-century textbook illustration of a triple Haxo casemate.

Subsequently, Haxo was regarded as the premier military engineer in Europe. He oversaw the fortifications of Belfort, Grenoble, Besançon, Dunkirk, Saint-Omar and Fort l'Ecluse. He is credited with the invention of an open-backed covered gun emplacement, known in English as the Haxo casemate.

During the later years of his life, Haxo wrote Mémoire sur le figure du terrain dans les cartes topographiques (Paris, N.D.), and the biography of General Dejean (1824).

General Haxo died in Paris on 25 June 1838, aged 64.

== See also ==
- Ceintures de Lyon
