= Defensive Sector of the Rhône =

French military organization

The Defensive Sector of the Rhône (Secteur Défensif du Rhône) was the French military organization that in 1940 controlled the section of the French border with Switzerland and Italy in the area of Geneva. The area was not regarded as a likely point of invasion, owing to the neutrality of Switzerland and the extremely difficult terrain along the Italian portion of the border. It was therefore lightly fortified. Its chief fortified position was the 19th-century Fort l'Écluse, manned by a small force, which held its strategic position against a Panzerkorps for a week in June 1940.

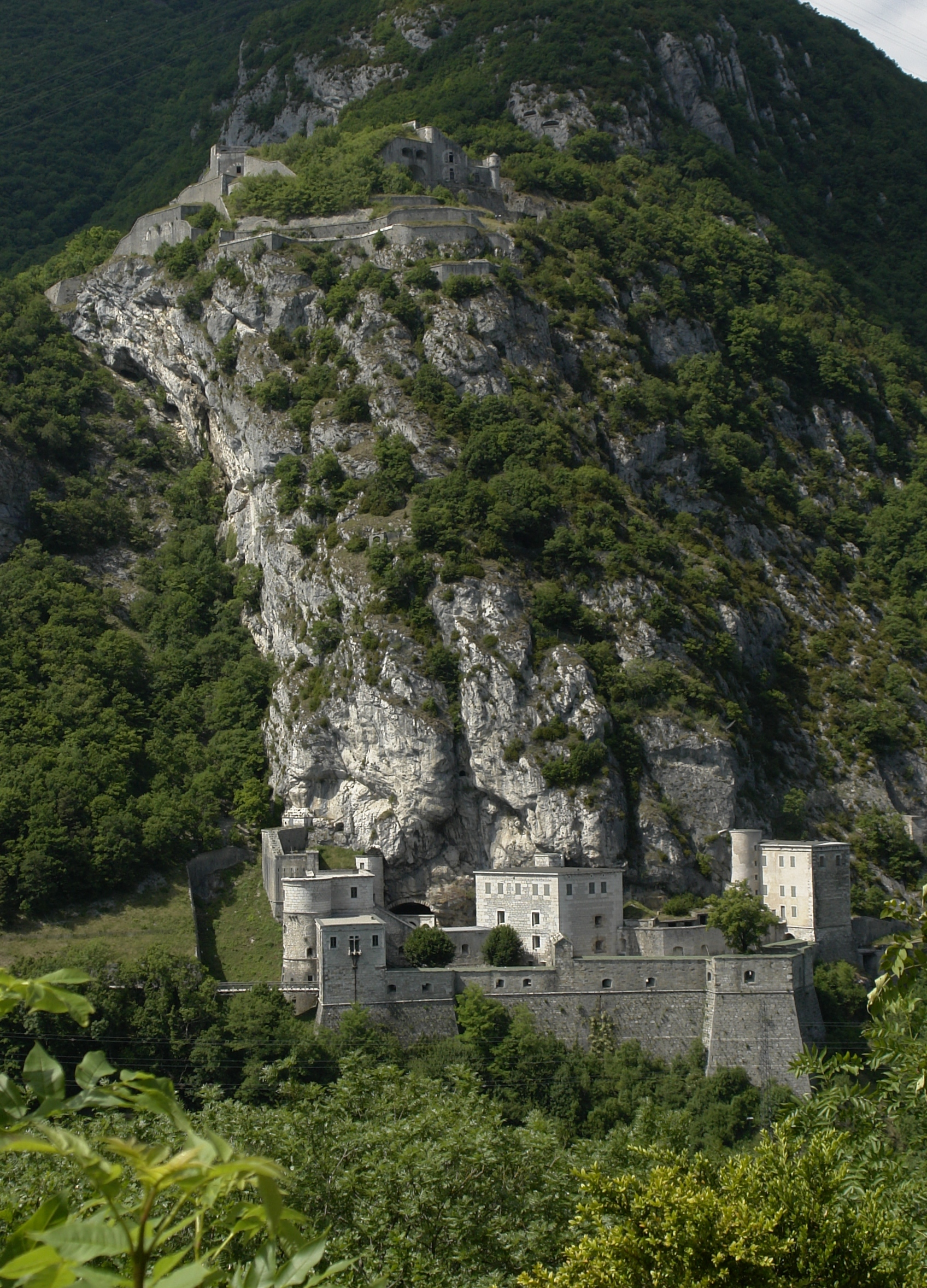
Fort l'Écluse, the chief fortification in the SD Rhône.

== Concept and organization ==
The SD Rhône was largely ignored until 1939, when a belated program was initiated to deal with a potential invasion through Swiss territory. The French were aware that the Swiss were fortifying their National Redoubt in the high Alps that would bar most invasion routes, but the French command thought it prudent to undertake their own measures. An initial 1937 plan envisioned three areas of effort, building Maginot-style ouvrages at strategic locations: (Note: English-language sources use the French term ouvrage as the preferred term for the Maginot positions, in preference to "fort", a term usually reserved for older fortifications with passive defenses in the form of walls and ditches. The literal translation of ouvrage in the sense of a fortification in English is "work." A gros ouvrage is a large fortification with a significant artillery component, while a petit ouvrage is smaller, with lighter arms.)

- Ouvrage Crêt Mourex with a 75mm gun turret, located to the northeast of Lac Léman

Four ouvrages were to be situated to the south of the lake, three armed with 75mm guns in casemates and one with a 75mm gun turret:

- Ouvrage Boisy
- Ouvrage la Douceur
- Ouvrage Epinacher
- Ouvrage Est des Gets

A final location in the upper Arve valley, armed with 75mm guns in casemates:

- Ouvrage de l'Argentière, interdicting the road between Martigny and the Col des Montets.

Since funding was more urgently needed on fronts that were obviously exposed, these proposals bore no fruit. A 1938 revision scaled the proposal back, replacing ouvrage Crêt Mourex with a fortified position at the bottom of the Col de la Faucille, along with five blockhouses at Crêt Mourex, Riamont, Le Pailly, Petit-Montrond and Montets, and a demountable turret at Arbère. The positions in Haute-Savoie were replaced by a fortification at the Saint-Gingolph frontier with four demountable turrets, as well as a center of resistance with six blockhouses at Les Dranses covering the Les Epinches - Pont de la Douceur, Morzine - Les Cluses, and Martigney-Chamonix axes, each with two blockhouses. In the final event, even this program was considered unaffordable and unjustified, and was scaled back yet further.

== Command ==
The Rhône sector was under the overall command of the Army of the Alps, headquartered at Valence, under the command of General René Olry. The SF Rhône was commanded by General Michal. The command post moved several times. It was first at Annecy in the Hôtel Beau-Rivage, then the Hôtel Jeanne-d'Arc from 2 September 1939. The command post moved to Sevrier, in the Hôtel de la Payde on 20 June 1940, then to Marthod on 24 June, then back to Sevrier the next day. The field army unit assigned the sector was the First North African Infantry Division. From October 1939, some units were replaced by the 64th Infantry Division, then in turn by the 66th Infantry Division. The SD Rhône was disestablished on 15 July 1940, after the French surrender.

== Description ==
The sector was manned by the 230th Demi-brigade Alpin de Forteresse under the command of Colonel Lanoyerie. Prior to mobilization in 1939, no active units were stationed in the sector. The sector includes, in order from north to south, the following sub-sectors and fortifications:

=== Sub-sector of Faucille - Fort-l'Écluse ===
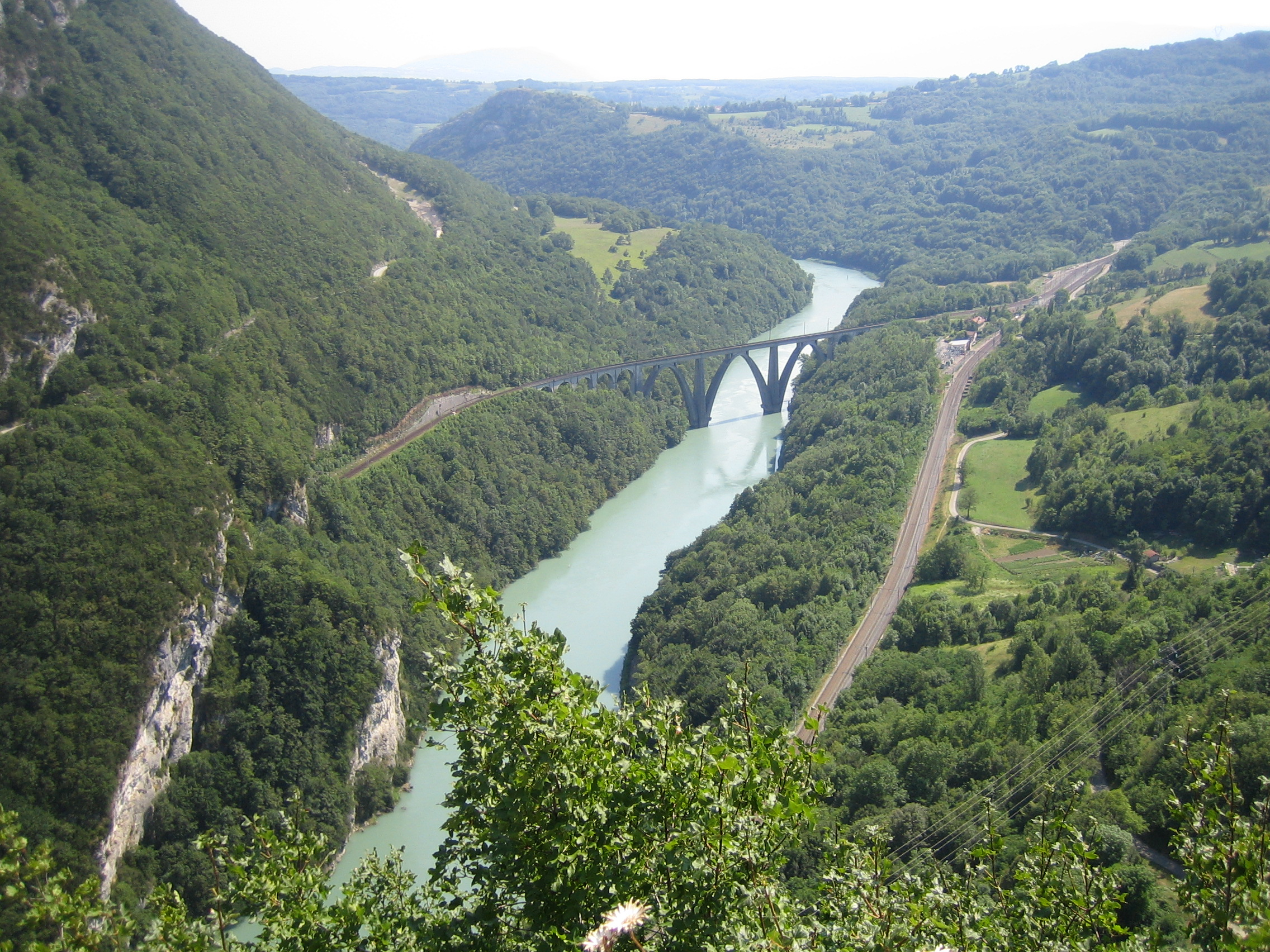
The Défile de l'Écluse with the Rhône River, with the reconstructed railroad viaduct.

At a narrow point in the Rhône valley, the sector consists only of the Fort l'Écluse, built in two stages in the first half of the nineteenth century. The fort was modernized with the Casemate du Tunnel, which guarded a road tunnel passing near the fort. The casemate was armed with two anti-tank gun, never installed, and automatic rifles. The upper portion of the fort mounted four 90mm guns.

=== Sub-sector of Chablais ===
The Chablais sub-sector covered the territory around Lac Léman with a series of blockhouses defending strategic routes. The sub-sector was further subdivided.

- Léman defenses: Interdiction of the road from Switzerland on the south side of the lake, with four blockhouses at Meillerie, one at Le Locum and five at Saint-Gingolph on the border.
- Valley defenses of the Pas de Morgins: Three blockhouses at La Chapelle d'Abondance.
- Arve valley defenses: Blockhouses on the road from Thonon-les-Bains to Les Gets, with two blockhouses at Thonon, two at Les Gets, and one at Châtillon-sur-Cluses, with prepared battery positions along the way.
- Annecy defenses: The area around and to the east of Annecy was further divided into east and west sectors at Allonzier-la-Caille. A line of 19 blockhouses extended from Groisy to Charvonnex, across the Fillère valley, a strategic rail passage. The line ended short of the Swiss border in accordance with treaty terms that forbade the construction of fortifications within a stipulated distance of the border. Other fortifications defended the La Clusaz - Annecy axis, with an infantry shelter (abri) (Note: An abri is an infantry shelter, sometimes underground or under earth cover. An abri in the main Maginot Line often closely resembles a casemate, but is more lightly armed and can hold more occupants.) at Digny Saint-Clair, with another at La Balme de Thuy, as well as a blockhouse at the same location. A gallery was built at Thônes.

=== Sub-sector of the Arve ===
The Arve sub-sector faced Italy with one blockhouse at Magland, two at Saint-Roch, and an abri at Vallorcine.

== Battle of France ==
No action was taken by Italian forces directly against the SD Rhône during the Italian invasion of France in June 1940. However, German forces advanced along the Rhône valley from the north. In early June the 230th DBAF (a demi-brigade of five battalions) was placed to block the German advance along a front between Frangy and Annecy. The German force was no less than Panzergruppe von Kleist, composed of the 3rd and 4th Panzer Divisions and the 13th Motorized Infantry Division. The Fort l'Écluse blocked the German advance toward Albertville, manned by a company of the 179th Alpine Fortress Battalion along with personnel from several miscellaneous units of artillery and regional reserve forces. Contact was made between French and German forces at l'Écluse on 22 June. The French held off the Germans, destroying the railway viaduct in front of the fort on 24 June. The Germans did not press further action, with the armistice taking place on the 25th.

Since no orders had been given to the fort's garrison following the armistice, they remained in place, barring passage. The standoff continued until 30 June, when General Charles Huntziger, in charge of post-surrender French forces, ordered the unit to permit passage to the Germans, and to surrender.

=== Units ===
The 230th DBAF was made up of five battalions, the 179th and the 189th bataillons alpins de forteresse and the 199th BCHM, as well as the attached II/440th Pioneer battalion and the II/281st infantry battalion. Apart from the unit taken prisoner at the Fort l'Écluse, the remainder of the 230th moved to the Rumilly area to regroup after the armistice. They ended up at Annecy on 17 July, and the regiment was dissolved on 31 July 1940. Active personnel were assigned to the Vichy French bataillon de chasseurs de la Haute-Savoie.

== Present status ==
The Fort l'Écluse was purchased by a syndicate of nineteen communities of the Pays de Gex and is operated as a museum. It has been open to the public since 1995.

== See also ==
- Fortress Saint-Maurice, barring the Rhône in Switzerland

== Bibliography ==
- Kaufmann, J.E. and Kaufmann, H.W. Fortress France: The Maginot Line and French Defenses in World War II, Stackpole Books, 2006. ISBN 0-275-98345-5
- Kaufmann, J.E., Kaufmann, H.W., Jancovič-Potočnik, A. and Lang, P. The Maginot Line: History and Guide, Pen and Sword, 2011. ISBN 978-1-84884-068-3
- Mary, Jean-Yves; Hohnadel, Alain; Sicard, Jacques. Hommes et Ouvrages de la Ligne Maginot, Tome 2. Paris, Histoire & Collections, 2001. ISBN 2-908182-97-1 (in French)
- Mary, Jean-Yves; Hohnadel, Alain; Sicard, Jacques. Hommes et Ouvrages de la Ligne Maginot, Tome 4 - La fortification alpine. Paris, Histoire & Collections, 2009. ISBN 978-2-915239-46-1 (in French)
- Mary, Jean-Yves; Hohnadel, Alain; Sicard, Jacques. Hommes et Ouvrages de la Ligne Maginot, Tome 5. Paris, Histoire & Collections, 2009. ISBN 978-2-35250-127-5 (in French)
