= British military mission to Greece =

British military mission to Greece may refer to:

- British naval mission to Greece (1911–1915); see First Balkan War
- British naval mission to Greece (1919–1921); under Commodore Howard Kelly
- British military mission to Greece (1942–1944), sent during the Greek Resistance in World War II; see Military history of Greece during World War II
- British military mission to Greece (1945–1952), sent during the Greek Civil War

== See also ==
- French military mission to Greece (disambiguation)
