= French military mission to Greece (1925–1932) =

The 1925–1932 French military mission to Greece was called to Greece to reorganize the Hellenic Army following the end of the disastrous Asia Minor Campaign and the turmoils that followed it.

The Greek army had relied on French models, and was often trained by French officers, ever since the first attempts to establish a regular army during the Greek War of Independence (1821–29). The first official French military mission to Greece occurred in 1828–31, as part of the Morea expedition. The Charilaos Trikoupis government invited the next, in 1884–1887 under General Victor Vosseur; Eleftherios Venizelos called the 1911–1914 mission under General Joseph-Paul Eydoux. Another mission under General Antoine Gramat came to Greece in 1918 as part of its participation in World War I, staying on until March 1923, when it was withdrawn on Greek request, citing budgetary constraints but most probably as a political gesture towards France.

As the political situation in Greece stabilized, following the Asia Minor Catastrophe and the collapse of the Megali Idea, a major effort to reorganize the state and its institutions was undertaken, although Greek finances were limited, and the country was further burdened by the presence of over 1.5 million Asia Minor refugees. As part of this effort, in September 1924 the Greek government requested a new French military mission. General Adolphe Guillaumat, who knew Greece as the wartime commander of the Allied Army of the Orient in 1917–18, arrived in October to assess the situation, and make recommendations to the French government. The new mission, under Lt. General Nicolas Georges Girard, arrived in Greece in March 1925.

The French mission extended French influence in Greece, and reinforced the tendency of the Greek army to closely copy French models—most Greek military manuals were translations of the equivalent French ones. Among the major achievements of the mission was the establishment of the Superior War School (Ανωτέρα Σχολή Πολέμου) as a staff academy, which was established already in April 1925, where members of the French mission delivered lectures. The mission was also crucial in the publication of the (heavily French-influenced) Great Military and Naval Encyclopedia (Μεγάλη Στρατιωτική και Ναυτική Εγκυκλοπαιδεία) in 1927–30.

Girard remained in Greece until April 1928, when he was replaced by Major General Brallion, who remained in charge of the mission until 1931, when he was replaced by General Julien Goubard. The French military mission left Greece in 1932.

== Sources ==
- Baloti, Xeni. "La mission militaire du Général Girard en Grèce (1925-1928)" (in French).
- Skaltsogiannis, Georgios (2014). "Η Ανωτέρα Σχολή Πολέμου και η Γαλλική Στρατιωτική Αποστολή στην Ελλάδα (1925-1928). Η γαλλική επιρροή" (PDF) (in Greek). Hellenic Army History Directorate.
- Spyropoulos, Panagiotis (2014). "Η επίδραση της γαλλικής εξωτερικής πολιτικής στη διαμόρφωση της ελληνικής στρατηγικής σκέψης (1830-1939)" (PDF) (in Greek). Hellenic Army History Directorate.
