= French naval mission to Greece (1884–1890) =

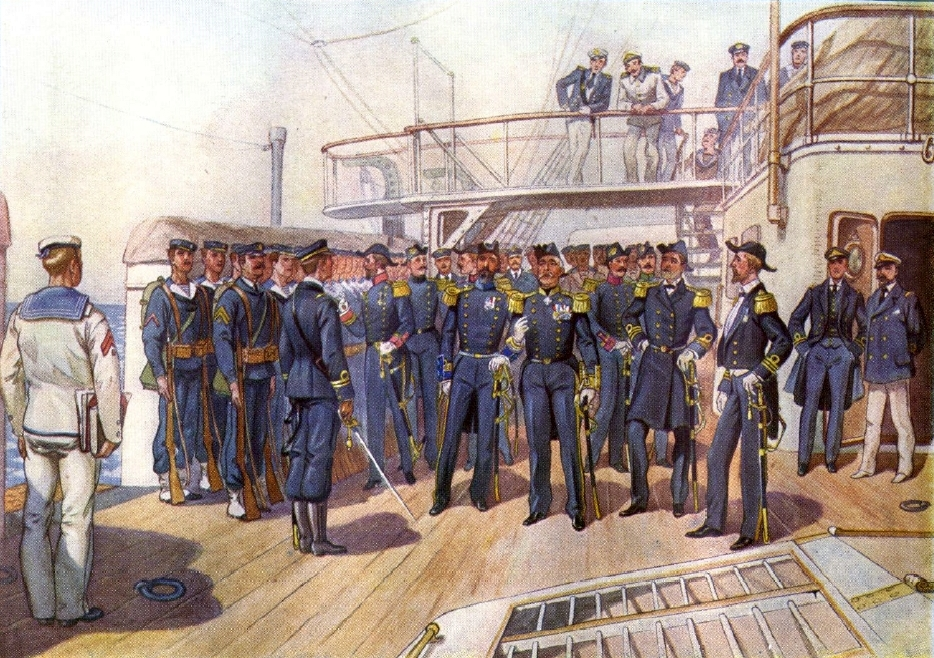
French-style uniforms were introduced to the Royal Hellenic Navy by the French naval mission

The 1884–1890 French naval mission to Greece was invited to the country by the government of Charilaos Trikoupis to reorganize the Royal Hellenic Navy, in parallel to a military mission for the Hellenic Army. The naval mission, headed by Rear Admiral Laurent Joseph Lejeune, arrived in Greece in December 1884, and remained in the country until 1890.

Among its major achievements were the establishment of a separate Naval Academy in 1884, administrative and legislative reforms, and the modernization in training and service regulations, including the establishments of a naval training centre at Poros Island and a naval hospital. Under the influence of the French mission, the Greek government engaged in major arms purchases from France: the three new Hydra-class ironclads, as well as the older cruiser Navarchos Miaoulis.

== Sources ==
- Spyropoulos, Panagiotis (2014). "Η επίδραση της γαλλικής εξωτερικής πολιτικής στη διαμόρφωση της ελληνικής στρατηγικής σκέψης (1830-1939)" (PDF). Hellenic Army History Directorate.
