= René Olry =

French general

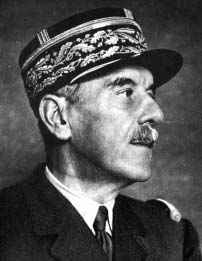
- Born: 28 June 1880; Lille, France
- Died: 3 January 1944 (aged 63); Angoulême, North Zone
- Military career
- Allegiance: France
- Branch: Artillery
- Service years: 1900–1942
- Rank: Général d'Armée
- Commands: Armee des Alps
- Conflicts: World War I; Western Front; Battle of Verdun; Italian front; World War II; Italian invasion of France
- Awards: Légion d'honneur

René-Henri Olry (28 June 1880 – 3 January 1944) was a French general and commander of the Army of the Alps (French: l'Armée des Alpes) during the Battle of France of World War II.

== Biography ==
=== Early life ===
Olry was born on 28 June 1880 in Lille in the Nord-Pas-de-Calais region of France. The son of Albert Olry, himself a polytechnicien, Olry was admitted to the École Polytechnique in 1900. Upon graduating, he joined the 21st Artillery Regiment and was appointed the rank of lieutenant on 10 October 1904.

=== Military career ===
During the First World War, Olry served in the Second Army at the Battle of Verdun under the command of then-general Philippe Pétain. He left for Italy in 1917 as part of the French expeditionary force and participated in combat near the Piave River, and in 1918 assumed command of the 283rd Artillery Regiment. His conduct during the war earned him five citations.

Olry became secretary of the Supreme Council of National Defense (French: Conseil supérieur de la défense nationale) in 1922 and served with the French military mission to Greece until 1928, when he was promoted to colonel of the 309th Artillery Regiment. He was promoted again in 1932 to the rank of brigadier general and in 1935 to Divisional General (a rank equivalent to major general) with command of the 29th Infantry Division, which he led until 1937. He later became commander of the 15th Army Corps in the southern Alps.

On 5 December 1939 Olry assumed command of the Army of the Alps. When Italy invaded France in June 1940, he commanded 190,000 men on the Alpine Line. Faced with an Italian force of 450,000, Olry's troops successfully stopped the Italian advance and then proved a tough opponent for the German troops which joined the battle. The performance of the French army in this theatre was far more successful than on the rest of the front and preserved some areas of France from occupation.

=== Final years and death ===
During the interim period following the French surrender Olry served as an inspector general. He was then appointed to command the 1st Divisional Group of the French Armistice Army: comprising four divisions in the non-occupied south. In June 1942 he reached retirement age and took up residence on his family estate in the Charente region of Mansle. Olry died on 3 January 1944 in Angoulême.

== Decorations ==
Olry was awarded the Légion d'honneur, the highest military decoration in France, at Officier rank (see Légion d'honneur#Classes and insignia) in 1920 and became a Commandeur of the Légion d'honneur in 1936.
