= Victor Vosseur =

Former French military officer

Victor Paul Vosseur (17 August 1831 – 9 April 1911) was a French military officer.

He entered the Ecole Spéciale Militaire de Saint-Cyr in 1845, and was named a Second Lieutenant in 1853. He was successively promoted to Lieutenant (1855), Captain (1857), Major (1870), Lt. Colonel (1872) and Colonel (1876). He served as chief of staff of XII Corps in 1878–82, and was promoted to Brigade General on 6 July 1882. He commanded the 4th Cavalry Brigade in 1883–84, and became head of the French military mission to Greece (1884–87). On his return to France he was promoted to Divisional General in 1888, commanding the 20th Infantry Division in 1889–92, and the II Corps in 1893–96.

== Sources ==
- http://www.military-photos.com/vosseur.htm
