= Defile (geography) =

Narrow pass or gorge between mountains or hills

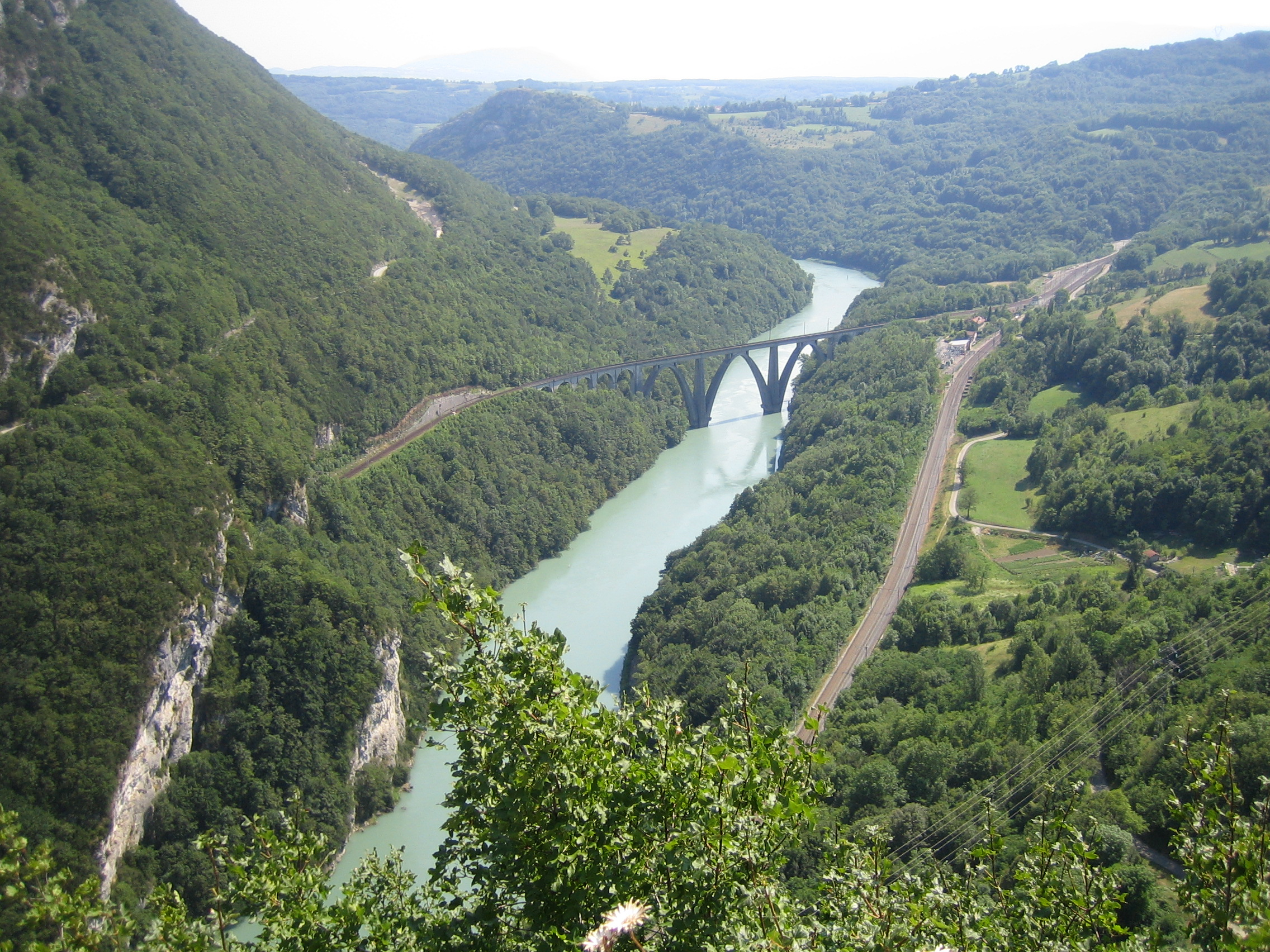
The Defile of l'Ecluse viewed from Fort l'Écluse

In geography, a defile is a narrow pass or gorge between mountains or hills. The term originates from a military description of a route through which troops can march only in a narrow column or with a narrow front. On emerging from a defile (or something similar) into open country, soldiers are said to "debouch". A fortification at the end of a defile is sometimes known as a debouch.

== Background ==
In a traditional military formation, soldiers march in ranks (the depth of the formation is the number of ranks) and files (the width of the formation is the number of files), so, if a column of soldiers approaches a narrow pass, the formation must narrow, and so the files on the outside must be ordered to the rear (or to some other position) so that the column has fewer files and more ranks. The French verb for this order is défiler, from which the English verb comes, as does the physical description for a valley that forces this manoeuvre.

Defiles of military significance can also be formed by other physical features that flank a pass or path and cause it to narrow, for example impassable woods and rivers. At the Battle of Agincourt, a defile formed by the woods of Agincourt and Forecourt caused a choke point for the French army and aided the English in their victory over the French.

Some defiles have a permanent strategic importance and become known by that term in military literature. For example, the military historian William Siborne names such a geographic feature in France near the frontier with Germany in his book Waterloo Campaign 1815:

On the following day, General Rapp fell back upon the Defile of Brümath; but this he quitted in the night, and took up a favourable position in the rear of the Suffel, near Strasburg.

— William Siborne

== See also ==
- Canyon – Deep chasm between cliffs
- Draw (terrain) – Long area of downward-sloping low ground
- Gully – Landform created by running water and/or mass movement eroding sharply into soil
- Ravine – Small valley, often due to stream erosion
- Valley – Low area between hills, often with a river running through it
- Water gap – Geological feature formed through a mountain
- Wind gap – Topographic gap made by a former waterway
