= Hellenic Naval Academy =

Military university in Attica, Greece

Coordinates: 37°56′03″N 23°37′41″E

Hellenic Naval Cadets Academy
- Σχολή Ναυτικών Δοκίμων
- Coat of Arms of the Hellenic Naval Academy
- Motto: Αεί τη Ελλάδι θαλασσοκράτορας παιδεύει ναυμάχους
- Motto in English: Nationwide we educate commanders of the high-seas
- Type: Service academy
- Established: 1845
- Parent institution: Hellenic Navy
- Superintendent: Rear Admiral Ioannis Retsas HN
- Dean: Professor Georgios Galanis
- Vice Superintendent: Commodore Ioannis Leivadaros HN
- Location: Piraeus, Attica, Greece
- Website: www.hna.gr/en/

The Hellenic Naval Cadets Academy (Greek: Σχολή Ναυτικών Δοκίμων, abbr. ΣΝΔ, lit. "School of Naval Cadets") is a military university that is responsible for educating and training competent naval officers for the Hellenic Navy. Founded in 1845, the academy is one of the oldest educational institutions in Greece.

The academy educates Deck and Engineering Naval cadets. It may also educate Coast Guard Officer cadets. Foreign nationals are also accepted to study as naval cadets at the academy.

== History ==
The academy has a long history in naval education. Its presence is closely associated with the foundation and evolution of the Hellenic Navy, covering 150 years of educational work. The academy was founded in 1845 as a naval training school on board the corvette Loudovikos. For 50 years, it operated unofficially on various combat ships, stabilizing its position and improving its work.

In 1884, with the help of a French naval mission, the Greek State officially reorganized and built new facilities to house its operations. At the time, the academy's quarters were on board the corvette Hellas.

In 1905, it was transferred to Piraeus, where it has remained ever since. The academy's base was transferred to a new and permanent installation beside the Piraeus harbour by the main port's entrance. The new quarters greatly improved the operating conditions, facilitating its operation. New cadets were accepted, and new Navy ships were appointed to help the educational process.

During its 150 years of operation, the Hellenic Naval Cadets Academy has evolved into one of the most prestigious institutions in Greece. More than 5,000 naval officers have graduated and led the Hellenic Navy, while many others have distinguished themselves in science, technology, and politics. The academy's organization and structure have made great reforms, according to the needs of the Hellenic Navy.

== Structure ==
The academy's organization is divided into two main branches. The first branch deals with education and training and includes four Directorates: The Naval Cadet Administration, the Nautical and Military training, the Athletics and the Academic Studies directorate. The second branch is responsible for base support and everything that needs to be done for the academy to function properly.

An officer of the higher naval ranks commands the academy. Issues involving academic studies are examined by the Superior Educational Council, a body formed of academy professors and naval officers under the chairmanship of the Academy Superintendent.

== Admissions ==
The screening procedure for selecting new cadets is based on the established system of national examinations undertaken by all university candidates in Greece. The Hellenic Naval Academy runs additional health, intelligence and athletic tests on its candidates. About 400 cadets study at the academy each year. All lessons are taught in Greek, and basic training lasts 4 years.

Greek nationals are admitted to the Hellenic Naval Academy following successful participation in the preliminary examination, that includes gymnastics, physical and psychological tests and the annual national examinations operated by the Ministry of Education. The number of admissions is decided by the Ministry of Defence, which issues an annual call for applications always according to the Navy's needs.

Foreign nationals are selected primarily by their governments, following bilateral agreements with the Greek state. Candidates must provide confirmation, issued by their government, that they have been selected for the particular military academy and must hold a birth certificate, a health certificate, and a certificate of education equivalent to the Greek Secondary Education Certificate required for admission to any Highest Educational Institution (University) in Greece.

Upon arrival, the foreign students attend one-year preparatory courses. The beginner-level teaching is conducted in Arabic, English and French. Students take Greek language courses, mathematics, physics and chemistry fundamental courses during that year and undergo military training. After the preparatory year, the foreign cadets join the full academic and military 4-year course, following the same program and obligations as their Greek colleagues. The education costs are covered by scholarships, including accommodation, tuition, training and clothing expenses, but not travel costs to and from Greece.

== Education ==
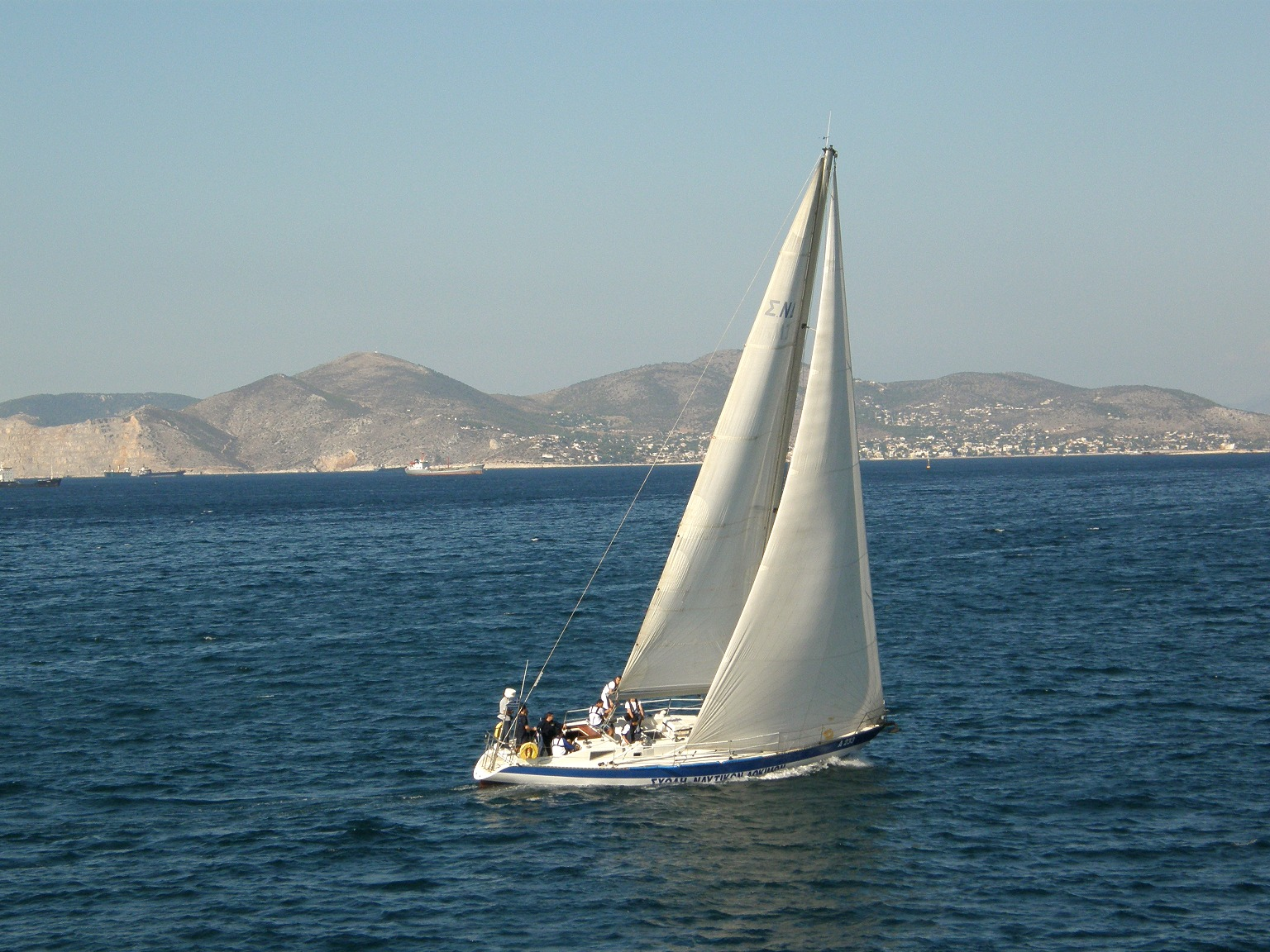
Sloop A233 of the Hellenic Naval Academy sails with a crew of naval cadet officers.

The Hellenic Naval Cadets Academy offers a 4-year course. The education aims to provide graduates (both deck officers and engineers) with adequate skills and knowledge to perform their duties as Navy Officers and keep up with evolving developments in naval science, strategy, and technology of naval warfare.

The day at the academy begins at 6.00 am. For five days every week the cadets attend an intense training program (academic, athletic, and marine). The afternoon is available for the rest of the academy activities, as well as various cultural, athletic and social events. The academic year is divided into two semesters.

During the winter term, cadets attend academic, professional military and naval training courses (off-board). In addition, they receive practical courses by participating in short training voyages on various naval ships. During the Summer term, cadets of the first three classes embark on a two-month training cruise, until recently on board the training ship HN Aris and for the past few years, usually on board a Frigate and a General Support Ship. The trip includes approaching the ports of various countries. Conditions for cadets to familiarize themselves with the profession and duties of an officer are provided through instructions on professional matters, onboard training and application of the theory taught, and drills carried out during the cruise.

== Graduation ==
Cadets graduate from the academy provided they have concluded all years and courses (academic and practical) successfully. Upon graduation, all naval officers are commissioned to combat units of the Hellenic Navy fleet. During the graduation ceremony, the flag of the Hellenic Naval Academy, following tradition, is handed over by new Navy Officers to the 3rd year cadets.

At the beginning of their careers, officers serve on battleships and attend certain specialized schools. These schools aim to enhance their expertise and familiarize them with battleship operations and functions during peace and war.

More specifically, officers are trained along the following lines:

Immediately after they graduate, officers attend a four to six-month school where they receive additional theoretical and practical training and learn about the systems and equipment of their appointed battleships and their duties as officers on those ships. During the first stages of their career, officers may also choose to serve in submarines, helicopters, marine patrol aircraft and underwater demolition (Special Forces) after being trained in their respective training schools.

Furthermore, when promoted to Lieutenant Junior Grade, they undergo a nine to eleven months training stage. There, they follow training held by various specialization departments of the Navy. According to the department they choose (or are appointed according to Navy needs), they take a degree of specialization in one of the following subjects: gunnery, navigation, communications, or electronic engineering.

Lieutenant officers attend the Navy Staff Officers School and the Naval War School for 3 to 4 months each school, where they obtain a Staff Officer degree. An officer may then serve as a staff officer in various departments of the Hellenic Navy.

Finally, officers ranked Lieutenant Junior Grade and Lieutenant may be educated abroad (in Europe or the United States) in schools such as NPS, MIT, the University of Michigan, etc., thus becoming further specialized in fields such as electronics, weapon systems, computers, operation research, marine architecture etc.
