= Fort l'Écluse =

Military fort in Léaz, Ain, France

Coordinates: 46°7′15″N 5°53′34″E

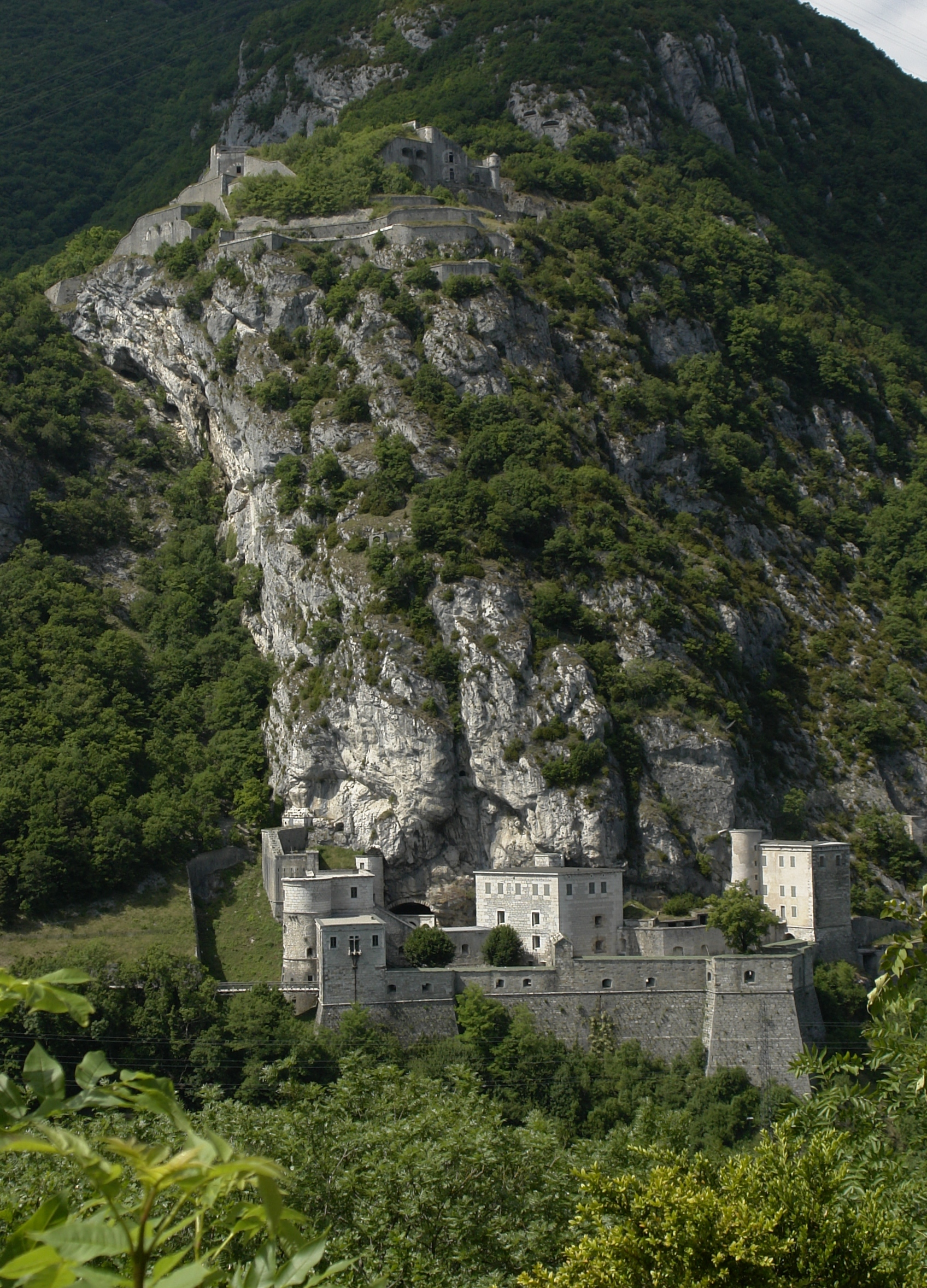
Fort l'Écluse

Fort l'Écluse, or the Fort de l'Écluse, is a military fort in Léaz, Ain, close to Collonges in Eastern France. It commands the Rhône Valley as a natural entrance into France from Switzerland between the Vuache and the Jura Mountains.

The fort, which was established by a Duke of Savoy, was completed by Sébastien Le Prestre de Vauban during the reign of King Louis XIV. It was destroyed by the Austrians in 1815, but rebuilt by the French; at the same time it was considerably strengthened and heightened. The high-road intersects a portion of this fortification.

== Description and construction ==
The lower fort (fort inférieur), near the level of the Rhône, was rebuilt between 1816 and 1828. The route nationale 84 passed through the fort until 1939 when it was relocated to a tunnel through the rock behind the fort, defended by a casemate in the tunnel built as part of the Maginot Line fortification program. The casemate was intended to receive 47mm anti-tank guns, but was never equipped. It is linked to the lower fort by a tunnel. The Fort l'Écluse was the largest component of the otherwise weakly fortified Defensive Sector of the Rhône.

Fort l'Écluse video

The upper fort (fort supérieure) is 200 metres (660 ft) above the lower fort. Its location allows the upper fort to control the valley, including the railroad viaduct, and to protect the lower fort. It was built between 1834 and 1848. Today, the lower fort and the subterranean steps and casemates cut into the rock above it, up to and including terraces just below the upper fort, are open during the summer months for visiting, however the upper fort is not currently safe for visitors. Furthermore, a moderately difficult (AD) via ferrata exists which takes climbers from the lower fort to the upper fort by traversing the rocky hillside. In addition, there are many hiking trails in the area which allow hikers access to the upper fort.

== History ==
In his Commentaries on the Gallic War, Julius Caesar describes the defile as "narrow and difficult … by which carts could be scarcely drawn one at a time, and moreover a very high mountain overhung it, so that very few could easily defend it." In their attempt to migrate to southwestern Gaul in 58 BC, the Helvetii initially tried to avoid this route by asking Caesar's permission to cross the Rhone into Roman territory at Geneva; when Caesar refused, they attempted to force their way across at several places, only to be rebuffed by a line of fortifications nineteen Roman miles long that Caesar had hastily constructed along the southern bank of the river. In the end, the Helvetii secured safe passage through the defile via an exchange of hostages with the Sequani, who inhabited the area.

In 1184, a church and residence belonging to the Saint-Claude abbey was built on the site. During the Middle Ages tolls were collected for passage. In the 13th century a fortified house was built at the site by the Sire de Gex. In 1293 the house was ceded to Amadeus V, Count of Savoy. In 1601 the Treaty of Lyon placed Gex in the hands of the French crown.

The fort was greatly expanded in the 17th century. The fort played a part in preventing French Protestants from leaving France following the revocation of the Edict of Nantes in 1685. The fort was burned in 1815 by Austrian forces and reconstructed in following years. The upper fort was built, linked to the lower fort by a tunneled stairway with 1165 steps. By 1860 Savoy became a permanent part of France and the fort was no longer of importance in controlling the frontier. During World War I the fort served as a military training center. In the 1930s the fort was incorporated into French frontier fortifications as a contingency against a German incursion through Switzerland. However, the Germans ultimately arrived from the west, rather than the east.

The fort held the passage of the Rhône against German forces in June 1940 during the Battle of France. A single company of the 179th Alpine Fortress Battalion, augmented with an artillery battery and personnel from a pioneers regiment under Lieutenant Mestrallet held the fort with 250 men against Panzergruppe von Kleist, composed of the 3rd and 4th Panzer Divisions and the 13th Motorized Infantry Division. For three days from 22 June the French force held the German advance. After the 25 June armistice, the fort's garrison stood its ground until directly ordered by the French command to stand down and to surrender.

== Present status ==
The Fort l'Écluse was purchased by a syndicate of nineteen communities of the Pays de Gex and is operated as a museum. It has been open to the public since 1995.

== Gallery of photographs ==
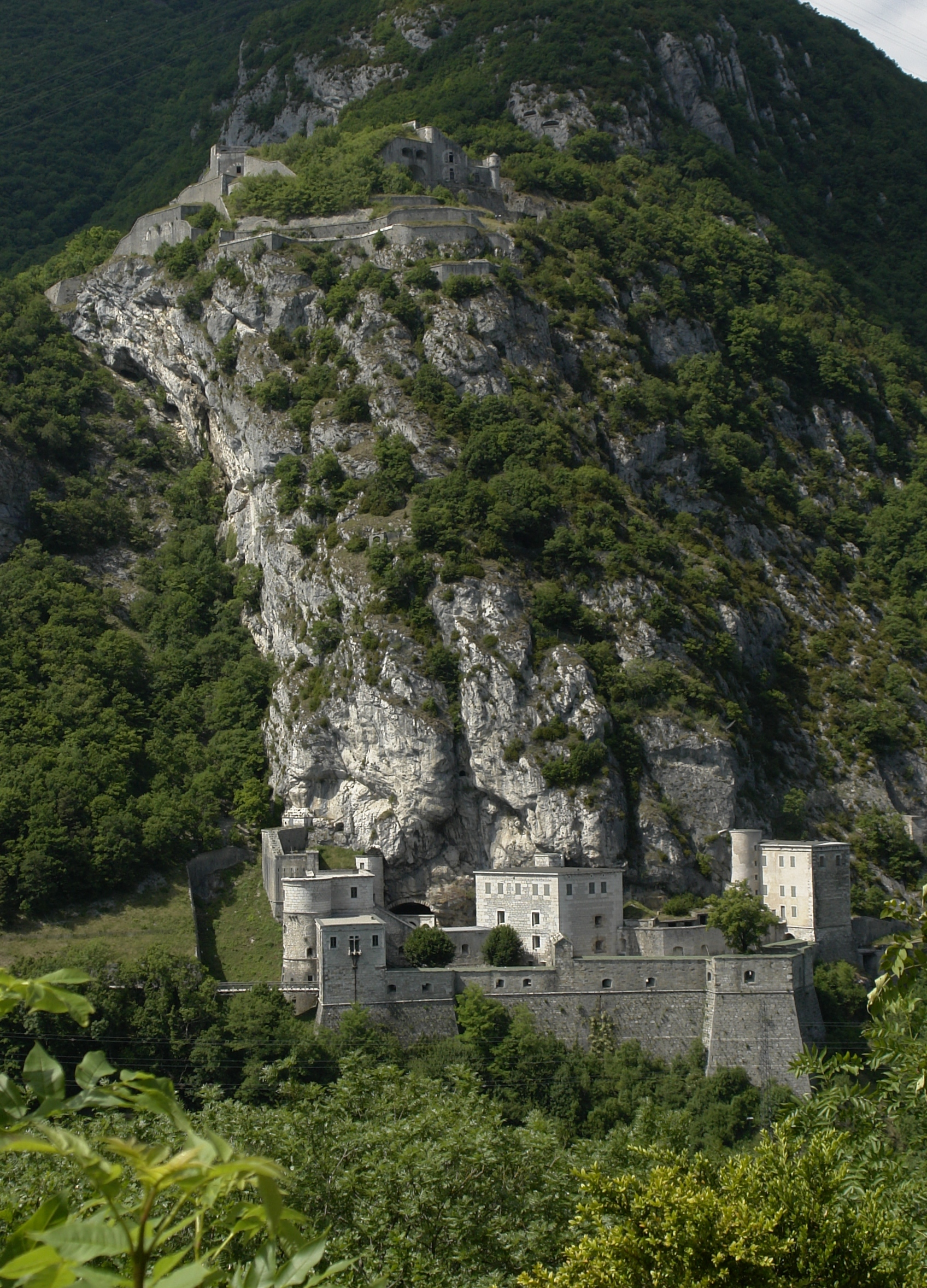
General view

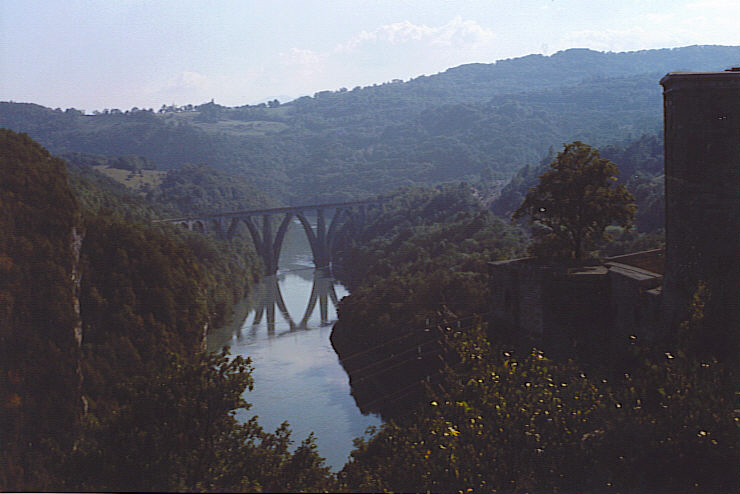
A vista of the defile of l'Ecluse from the fort

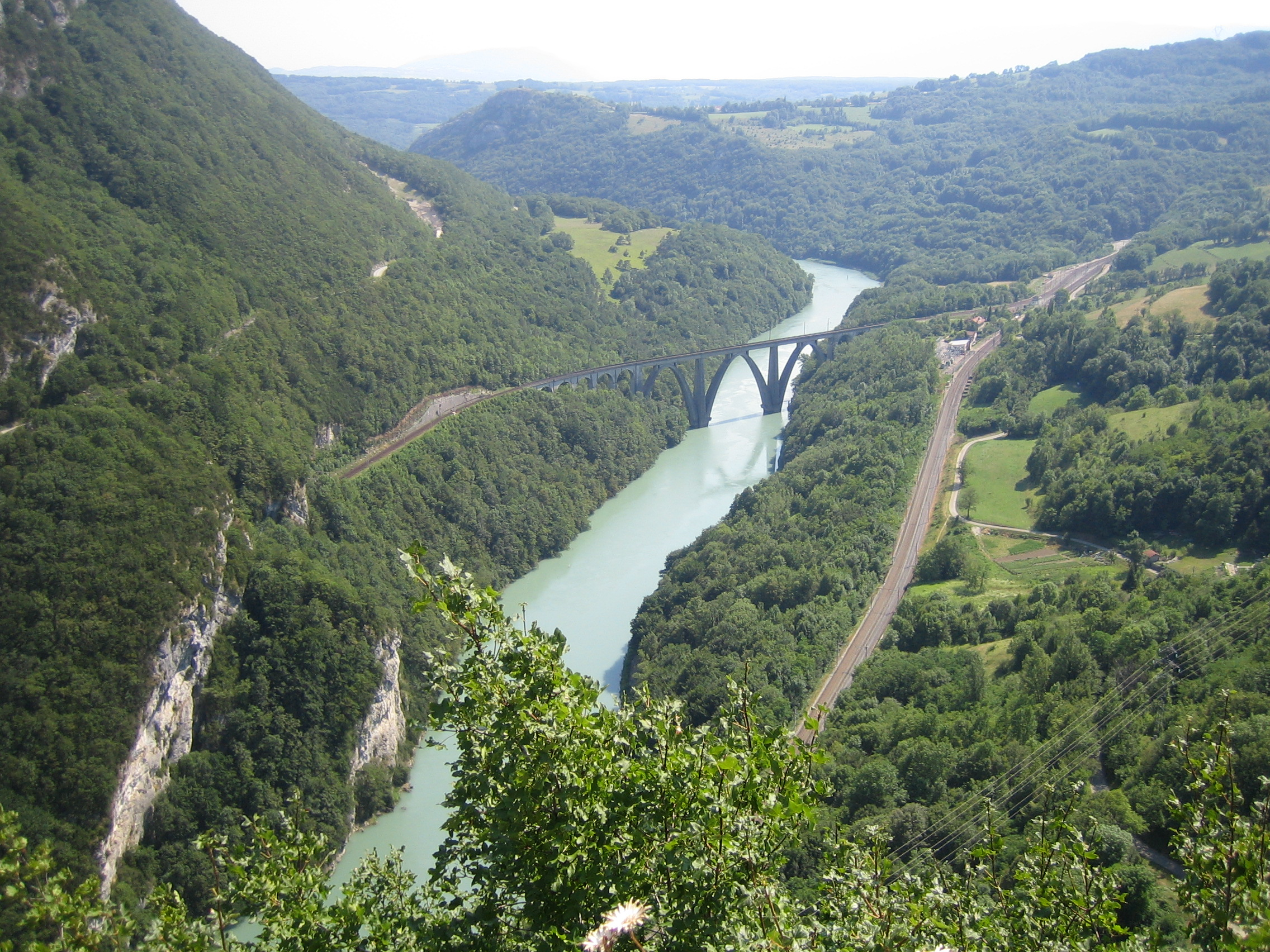
Another vista of the defile of l'Ecluse from the fort.

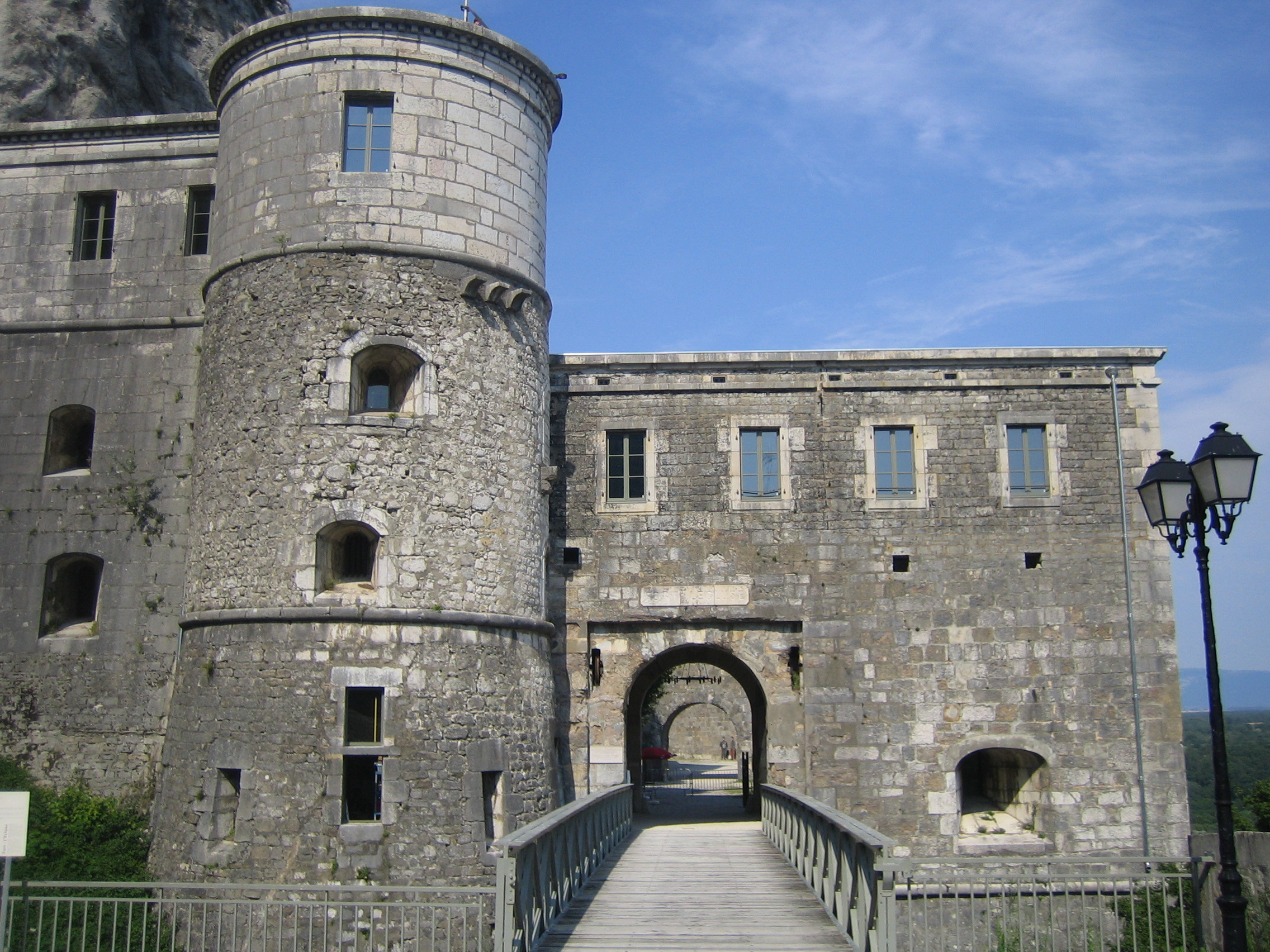
Main entrance of lower fort.

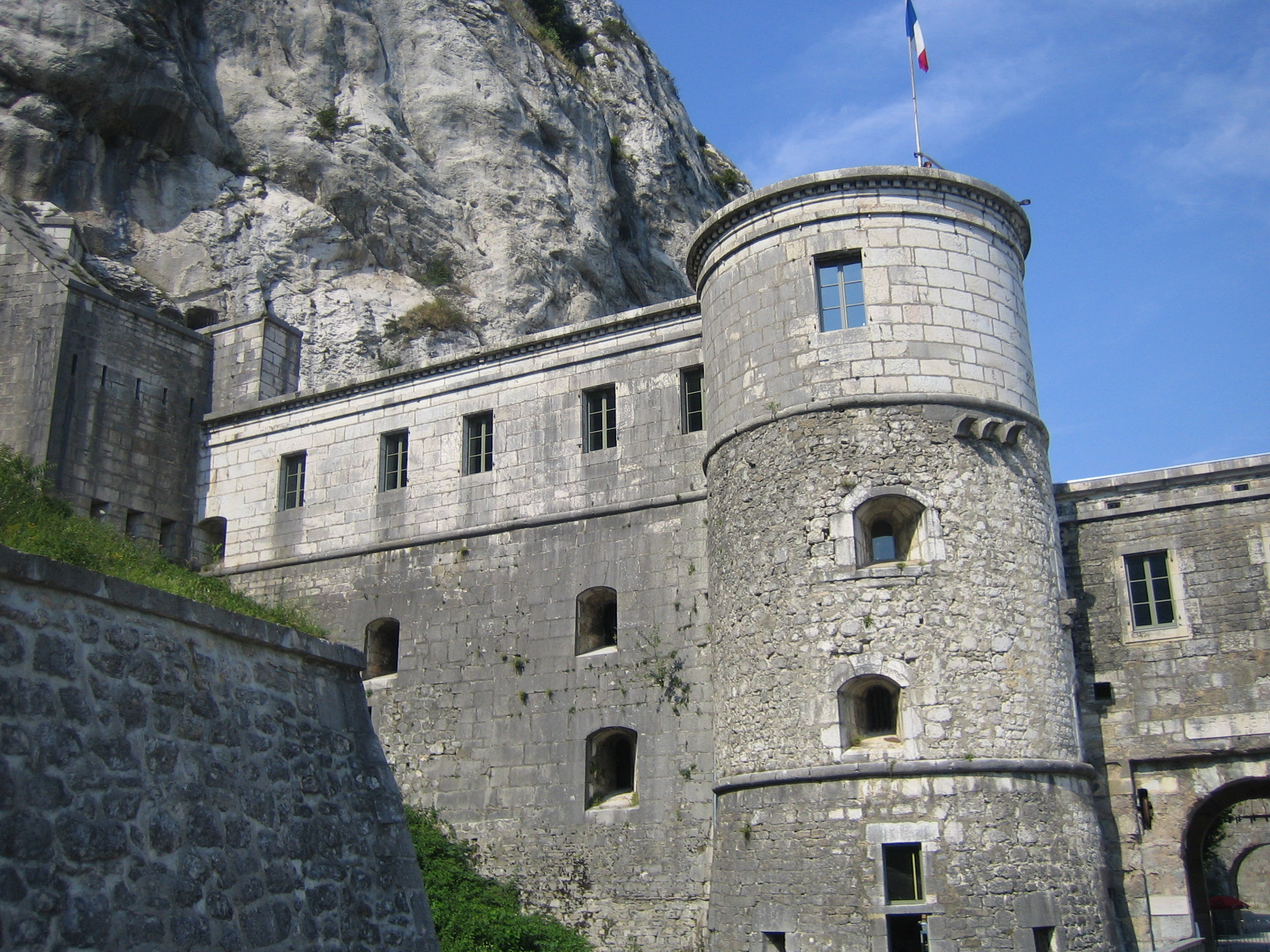
The tower next to the main entrance.

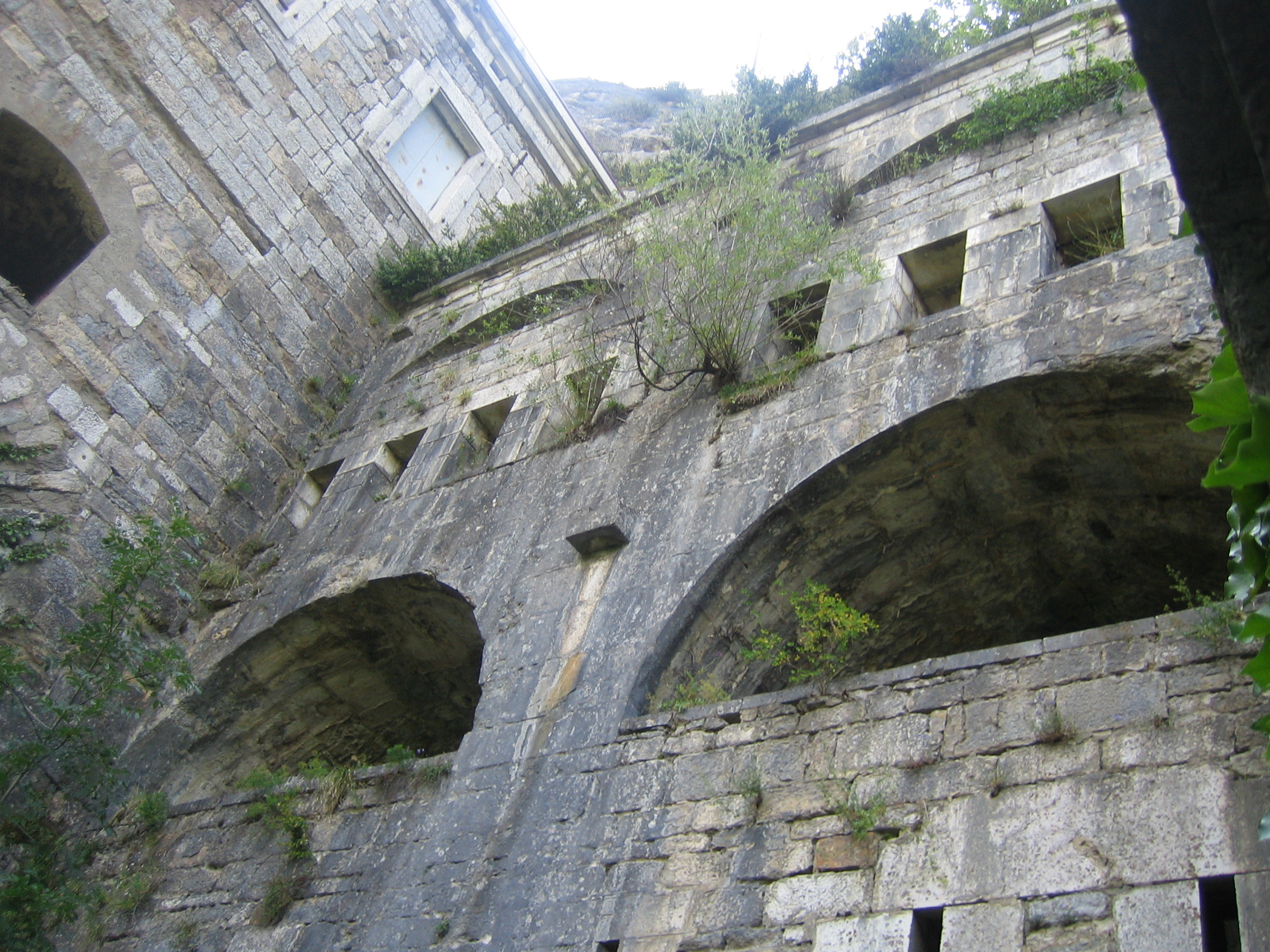
Eastern fortifications lower fort.

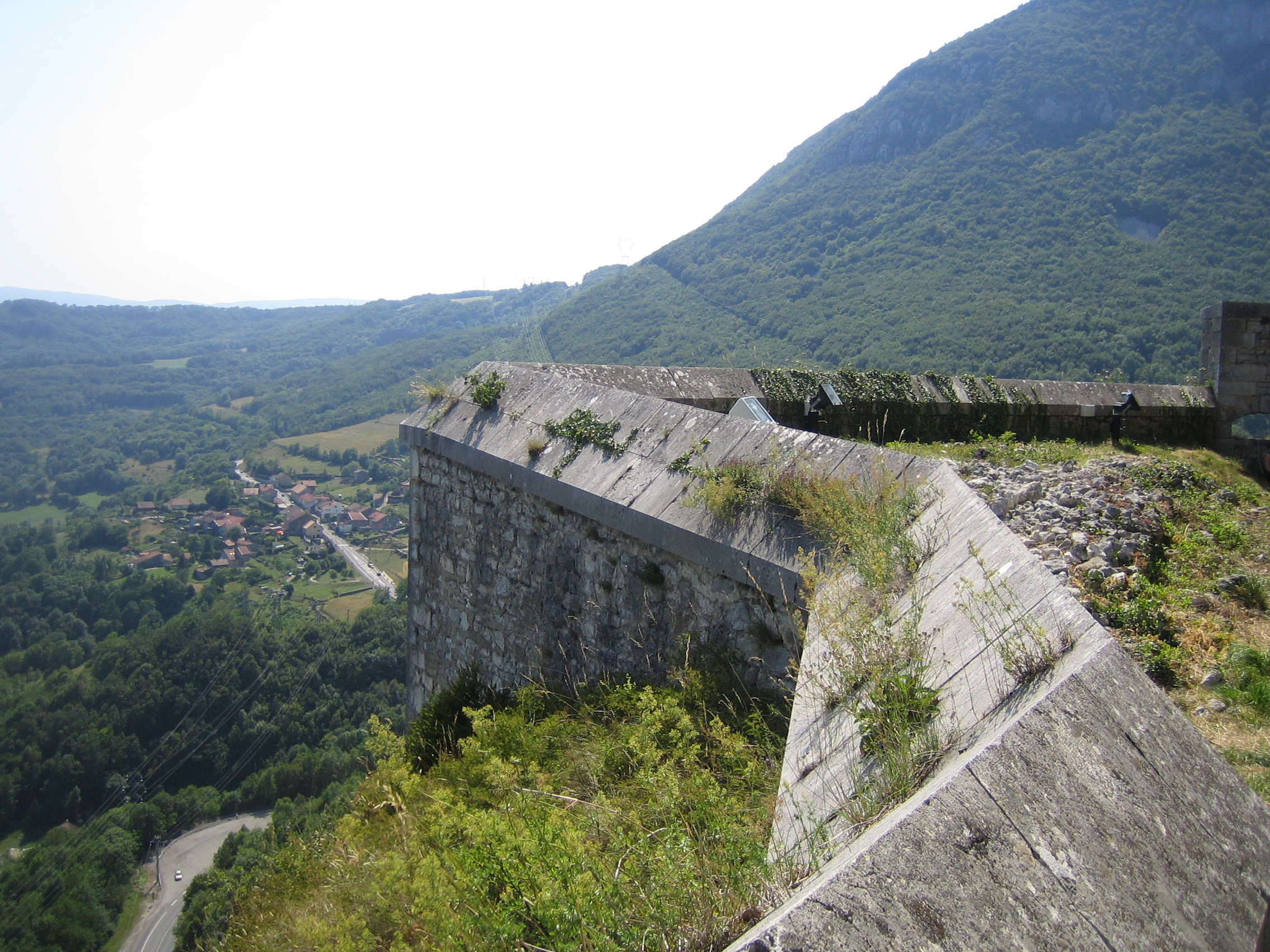
Looking west on the place called Longeray from higher fort.

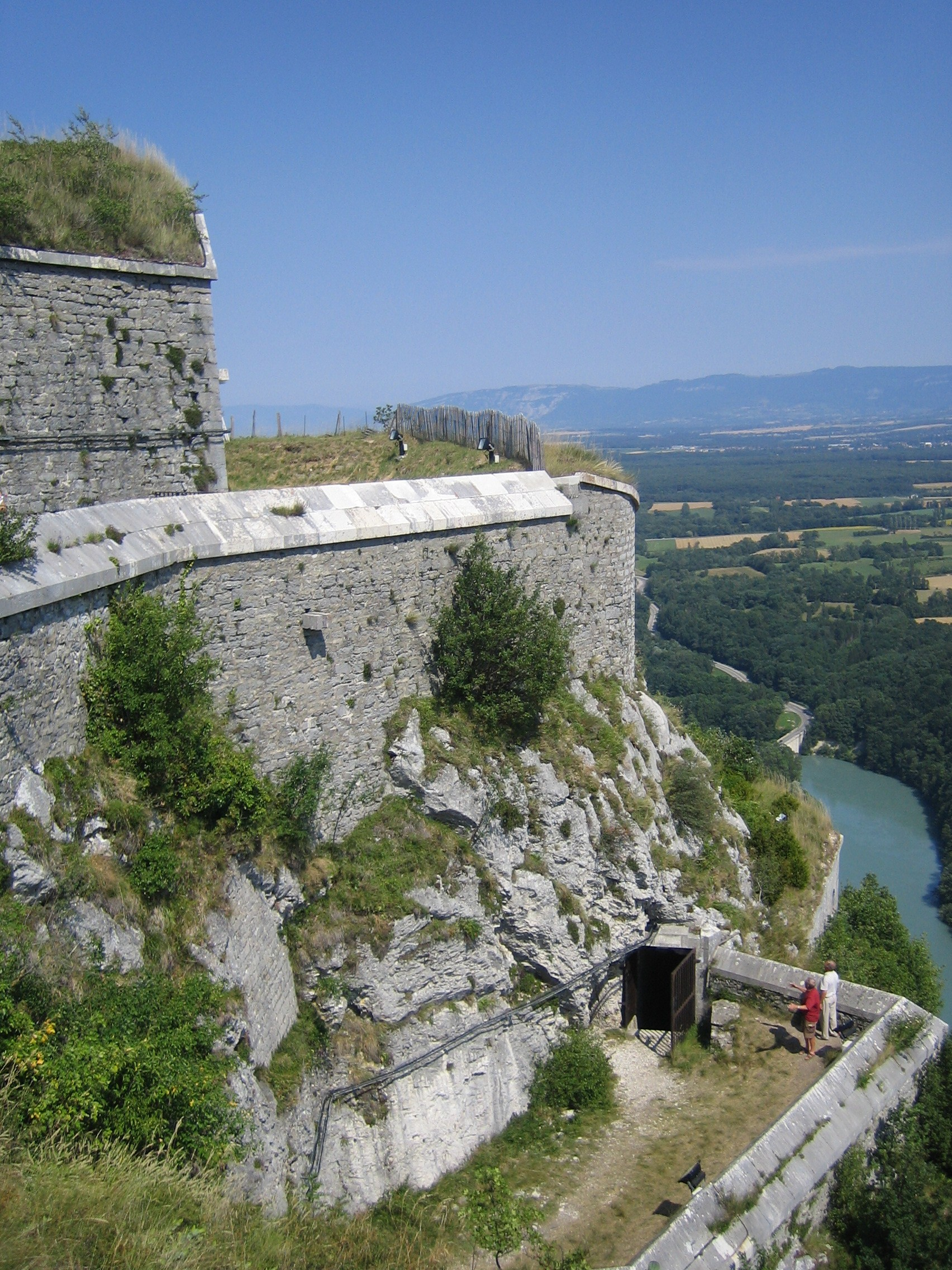
Looking east from higher fort.

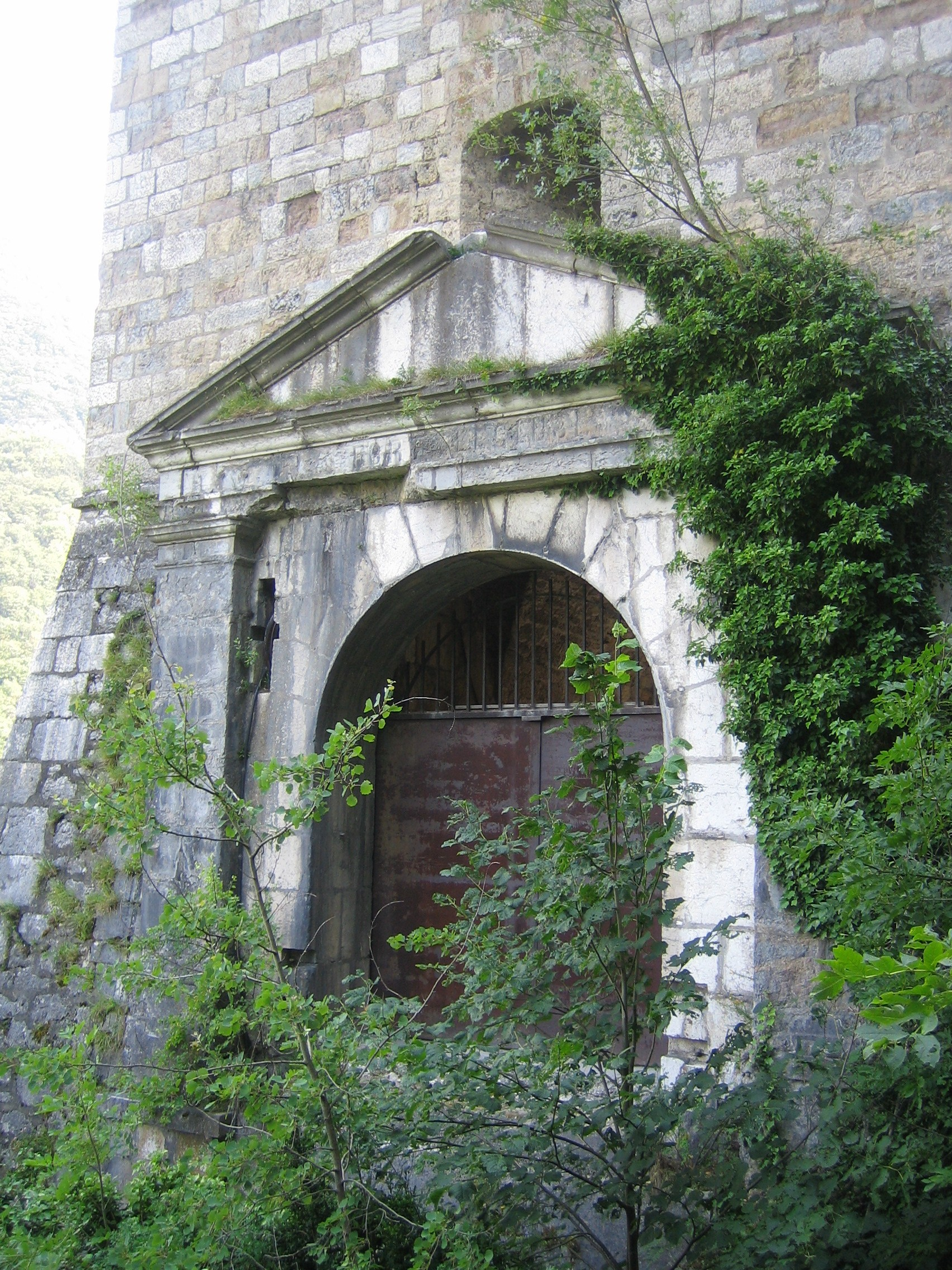
Former eastern entrance of the lower fort.

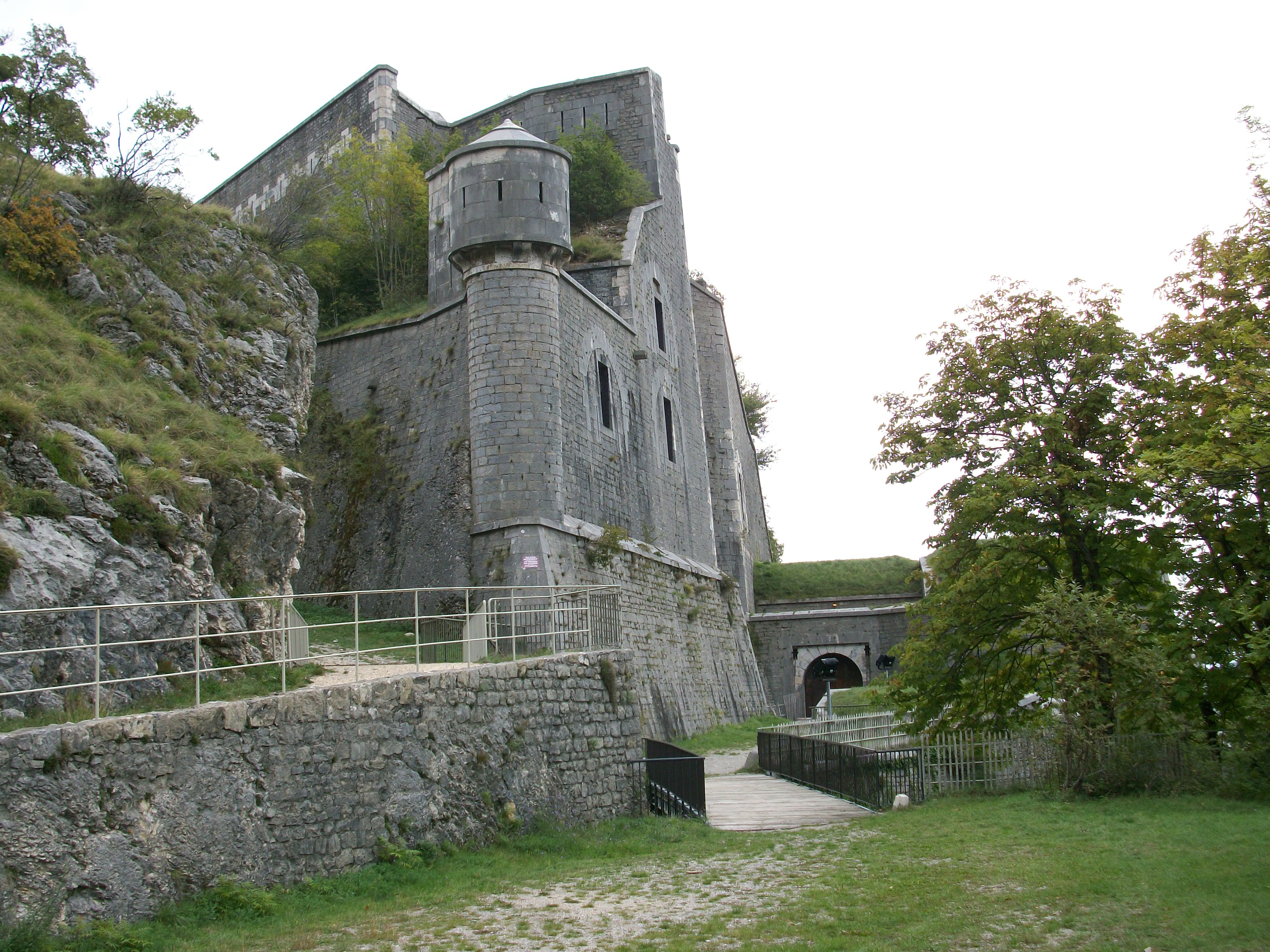
The upper fort.

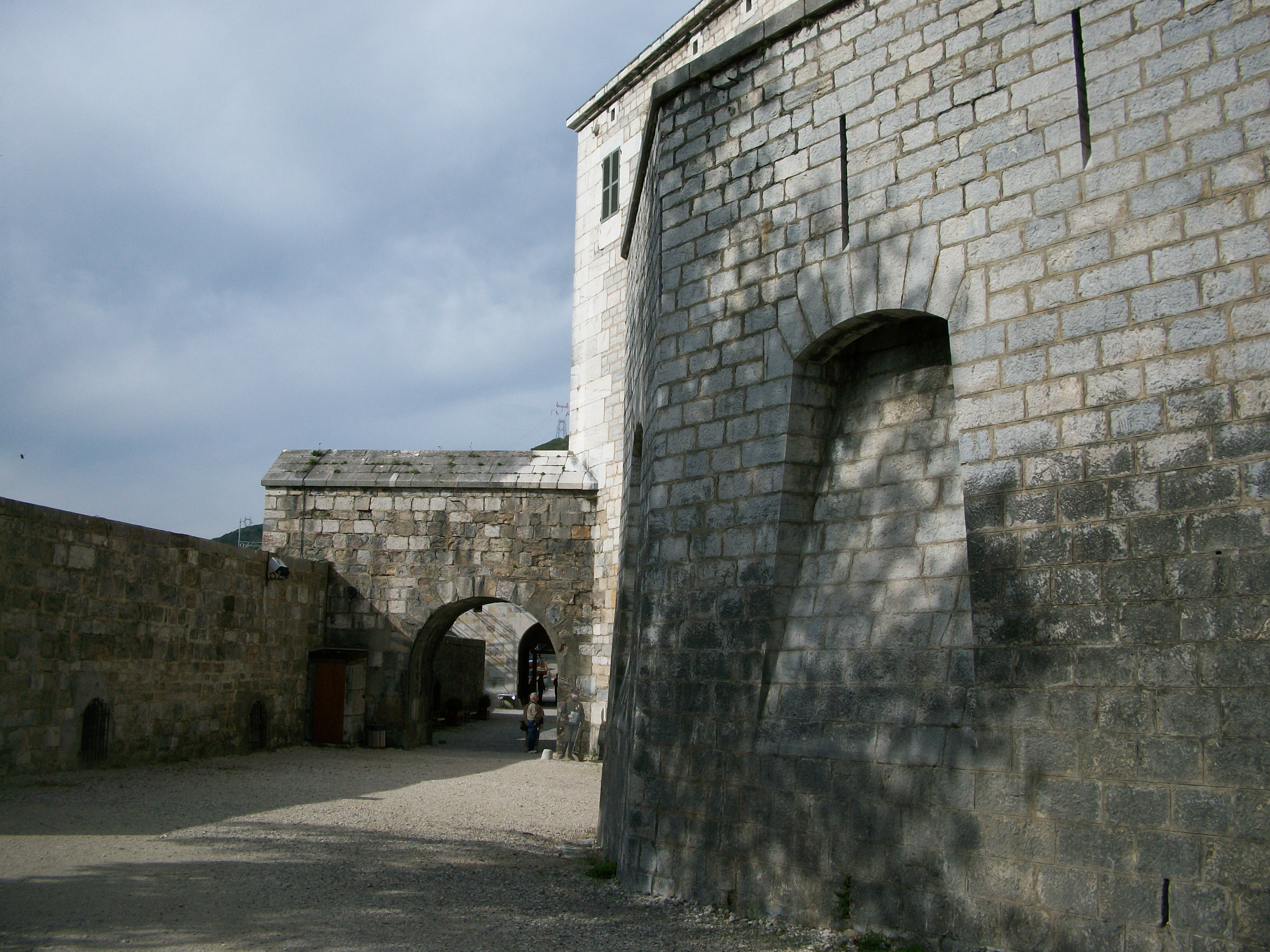
Entry way of the upper fort.

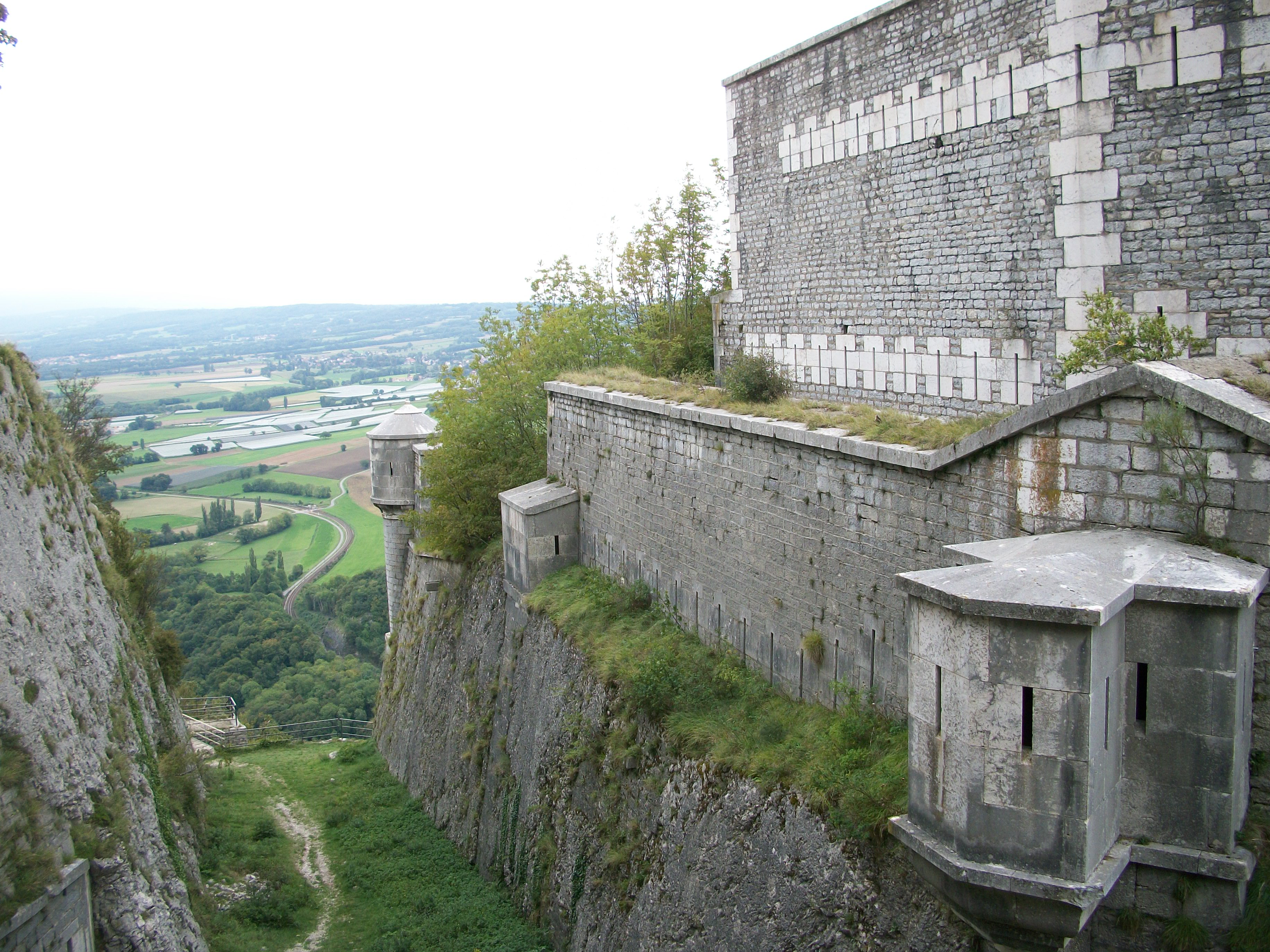
The back of the upper fort.

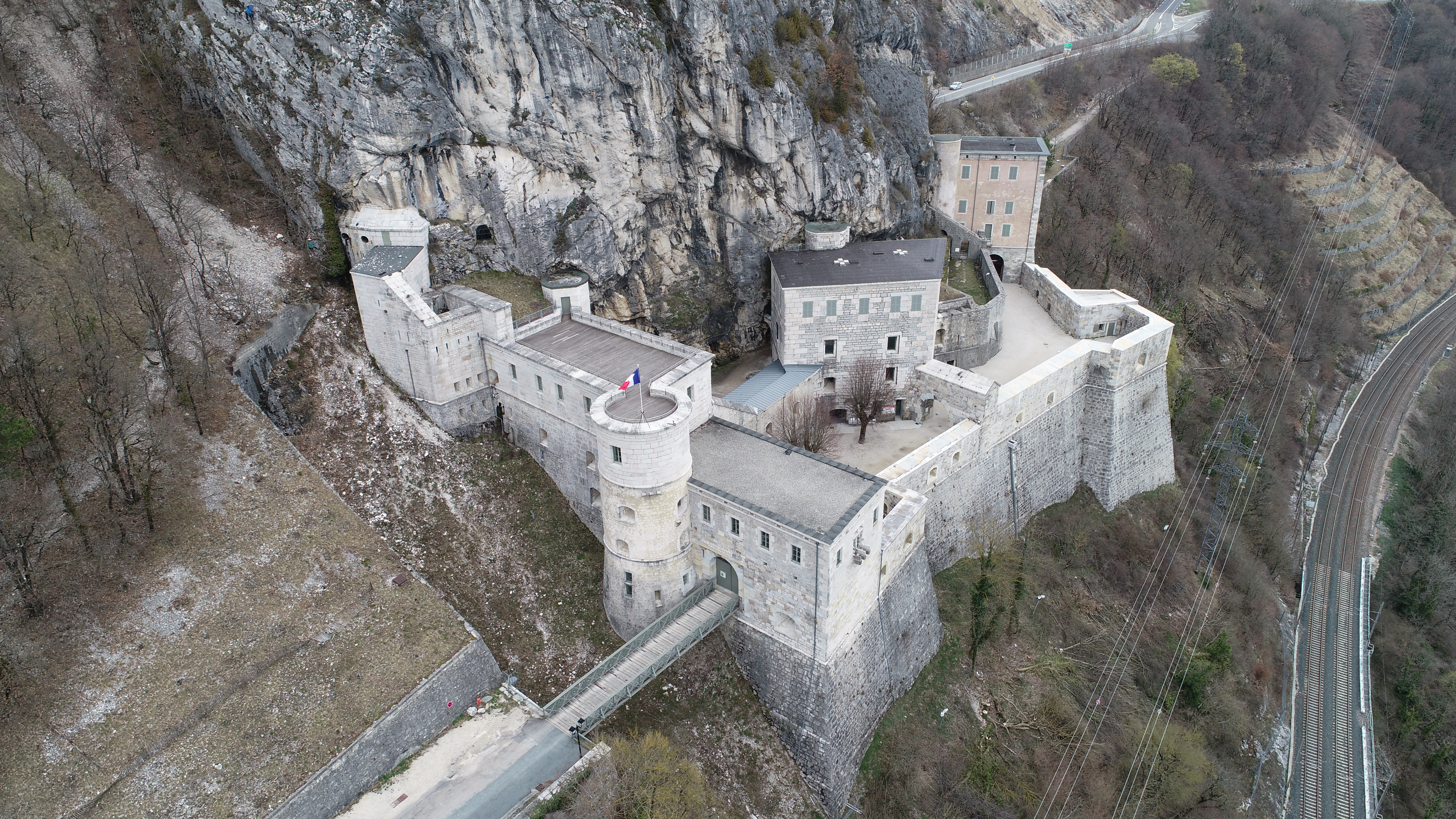
Aerial view of the lower fort.
