= French military mission to Greece (1884–1887) =

The 1884–1887 French military mission to Greece was invited to the country by the government of Charilaos Trikoupis to reorganize the Hellenic Army, parallel to a French naval mission for the Royal Hellenic Navy. The Army mission, headed by Brigade General Victor Vosseur, arrived in Greece in November 1884. In the event, it was not able to achieve as much as was initially hoped for, due to lack of funds and Trikoupis' own focus on the Navy.

It was nevertheless followed a generation later by the more successful French military mission to Greece (1911–14).

== Sources ==
- Fotakis, Zisis (2005). Greek naval strategy and policy, 1910–1919. Routledge. p. 8. ISBN 978-0-415-35014-3.
- Spyropoulos, Panagiotis (2014). "Η επίδραση της γαλλικής εξωτερικής πολιτικής στη διαμόρφωση της ελληνικής στρατηγικής σκέψης (1830-1939)" (PDF). Hellenic Army History Directorate.
