= Louis Dartige du Fournet =

French WWI vice admiral

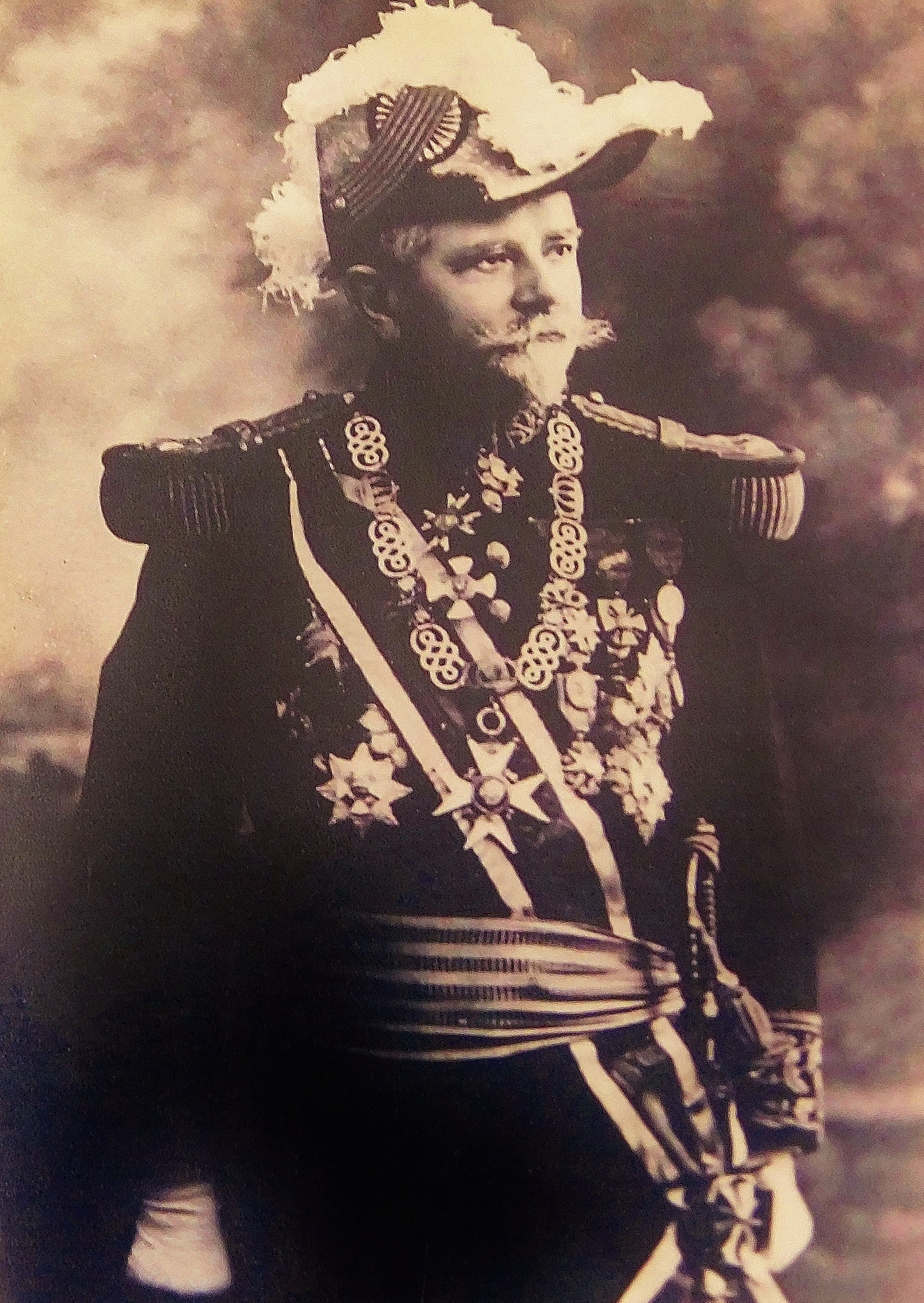
- Dartige du Fournet in 1910
- Born: Louis René Charles Marie Dartige du Fournet; 2 March 1856; Putanges-Pont-Écrepin, France
- Died: 16 February 1940 (aged 83); Périgueux, France
- Burial place: Saint-Chamassy, France
- Military career
- Allegiance: France
- Branch: French Navy
- Service years: 1872–1917
- Rank: Vice-amiral (Vice Admiral)
- Commands: Comète; Surcouf; D'Entrecasteaux; Mediterranean Squadron; 3rd Squadron; Allied Fleets, Mediterranean Sea
- Conflicts: Franco-Siamese conflict; First Balkans War; World War I; Noemvriana
- Awards: Grand Officer of the Legion of Honor; Croix de guerre 1914-1918

Louis René Charles Marie Dartige du Fournet (Putanges-Pont-Écrepin, 2 March 1856 – Périgueux, 16 February 1940) was a French vice admiral during World War I.

== Family ==
The Dartige du Fournet family is a surviving family of the old French bourgeoisie, originally from Felletin, in what is now the Creuse department of France. The progenitor of the family was François Dartige (1600–1674), bourgeois and postmaster at Felletin. It was in the 19th century that the Dartige family took up the name "du Fournet," the surname of a family of former nobility, now extinct, some of whose members were close to Bertrand du Guesclin. The Dartige du Fournet family still owns the Château du Fournet, in Saint-Judoce, France.

== Biography ==
=== Early and personal life ===
Louis Dartige du Fournet was born Louis Dartige in Putanges-Pont-Écrepin, France, on 2 March 1856, but his father, Louis Auguste Dartige (receiver of registration and domains), was authorized by presidential decree in 1877 to add "du Fournet" to the family name, reviving the name borne by one of his maternal ancestors and recalling the Château du Fournet in Saint-Judoce, in Côtes-du-Nord (now Côtes-d'Armor), where his father lived. (The chateau still houses a portrait of Louis Dartige du Fournet). His mother was Sidonie Olympe Mourin d'Arfeuille. He married Marie Vauquelin de la Rivière, then Edmée de la Borie de la Batut.

=== Naval career ===
==== Early career ====
Dartige du Fournet entered the Ecole Navale (the French naval academy) on 5 October 1872, coming aboard the school ship Borda, which housed the academy, at Brest, France. He graduated as his class's valedictorian. He became a midshipman 2nd class on 1 August 1874, and soon was promoted to midshipman first class. He embarked on the central battery ironclad Richelieu on 5 October 1875 and served in the Escadre d'évolution ("Evolution Squadron") in 1876. In 1877, he was assigned to the frigate Isis for a military campaign in West Africa.

Dartige du Fournet was promoted to enseigne de vaisseau (ensign) on 20 June 1878, after which he served aboard the 30-gun brig Beaumanoir on the Iceland Station. As of 1 January 1879, he was in residence at Brest.

In 1881, Dartige du Fournet served aboard the sloop-of-war Parseval in the Cochinchina Naval Division. He received a promotion to lieutenant on 27 January 1883. As of 1 January 1885, he was aboard the unprotected cruiser Villars in the Far East Squadron. He became a Knight of the Legion of Honour on 28 December 1885.

As of 1 January 1886, Dartige du Fournet was executive officer of the aviso Bouvet in the North Atlantic Naval Division. In 1889, he served in the Department of Underwater Defenses of the 5th Maritime District in Toulon, France. He became orderly officer for the French minister of the navy in January 1891.

==== 1893–1914 ====
In 1893, Dartige du Fournet became commanding officer of the gunboat Comète. On 13 July 1893, in the Paknam Incident during the Franco-Siamese conflict, Dartige du Fournet, under the orders of Capitaine de frégate (Frigate captain) Bory, commanding the aviso L'Inconstant, forced the pass off Paknam on Siam's Chao Phraya River aboard Comète to clear the port of Bangkok. Dartige du Fournet distinguished himself in the battle, which contributed to Siam conceding the Mekong River′s left bank (now Laos) to France.

Promoted to capitaine de frégate (frigate captain) on 18 September 1893, Dartige du Fournet served as executive officer of a new school ship Borda, which housed the Ecole Navale, at Brest from 1894 to 1895. He was executive officer of the armored cruiser Pothuau in 1897. Promoted to commander in 1897, he became an Officer of the Legion of Honour on 31 August 1897, the President of France, Félix Faure, presenting him with the award at Dunkirk, France. On 1 January 1899, he was commanding officer of the protected cruiser Surcouf of the Northern Squadron.

On 1 January 1901, Dartige du Fournet was the commanding officer of the protected cruiser D'Entrecasteaux, at first in special reserve at Toulon and later in the Far East Naval Division, where D'Entrecasteaux took part in operations along the coast of China. He was promoted to captain on 18 April 1901. By 1 January 1903, he was in residence at Cherbourg, France, and on 1 January 1904 he was serving as chief of staff to Vice admiral Carles Bayle, commander-in-chief of the Far East Squadron, aboard Bayle's flagship, the armored cruiser Montcalm. By 1 January 1906 he was at Toulon, and on 1 June 1908 he was serving as deputy chief of staff of the 5th Maritime District at Toulon.

Dartige du Fournet was promoted to rear admiral on 9 September 1909. He became major general of the 4th Maritime District at the Rochefort Arsenal in Rochefort, France, on 16 April 1910. In April 1911, he took command of a division of the 1st Squadron, flying his flag first on the armored cruiser Jules Ferry and later on the arrmored cruiser Léon Gambetta. During the First Balkan War (1912–1913), he commanded the French Mediterranean Fleet and carried out a campaign in the Eastern Mediterranean. He became a Commander of the Legion of Honour on 10 July 1913 and received a promotion to vice admiral on 28 November 1913. He then served as maritime prefect of Algeria and Tunisia until August 1914.

==== World War I ====
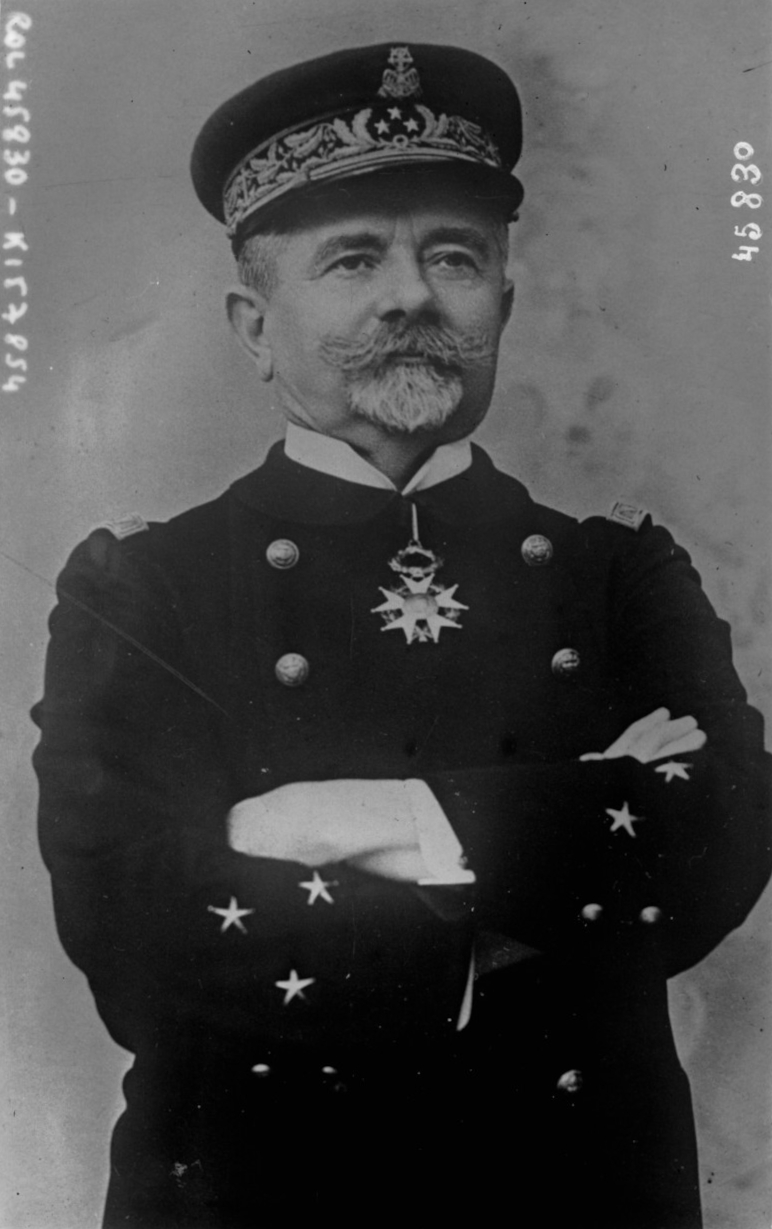
Louis Dartige du Fournet in 1915.

France entered World War I in August 1914, and Dartige du Fournet became commander of the newly created French 3rd Squadron in February 1915, with the battleship Saint Louis as his flagship. Based in Syria or at Port Said in Egypt (according to different sources), the squadron became responsible for enforcing the blockade of the Ottoman Empire decreed in August 1915.

Dartige du Fournet took command of the Allied Dardanelles Squadron in September 1915 with the battleship France as his flagship. He instigated the development of the French insular strategy in the Eastern Mediterranean, in which, as part of the fight against the Ottoman Empire, the French Navy took possession of the islands of Rouad in September 1915 and Kastellorizo in December 1915. It set up particularly active intelligence centers there which operated throughout the war.

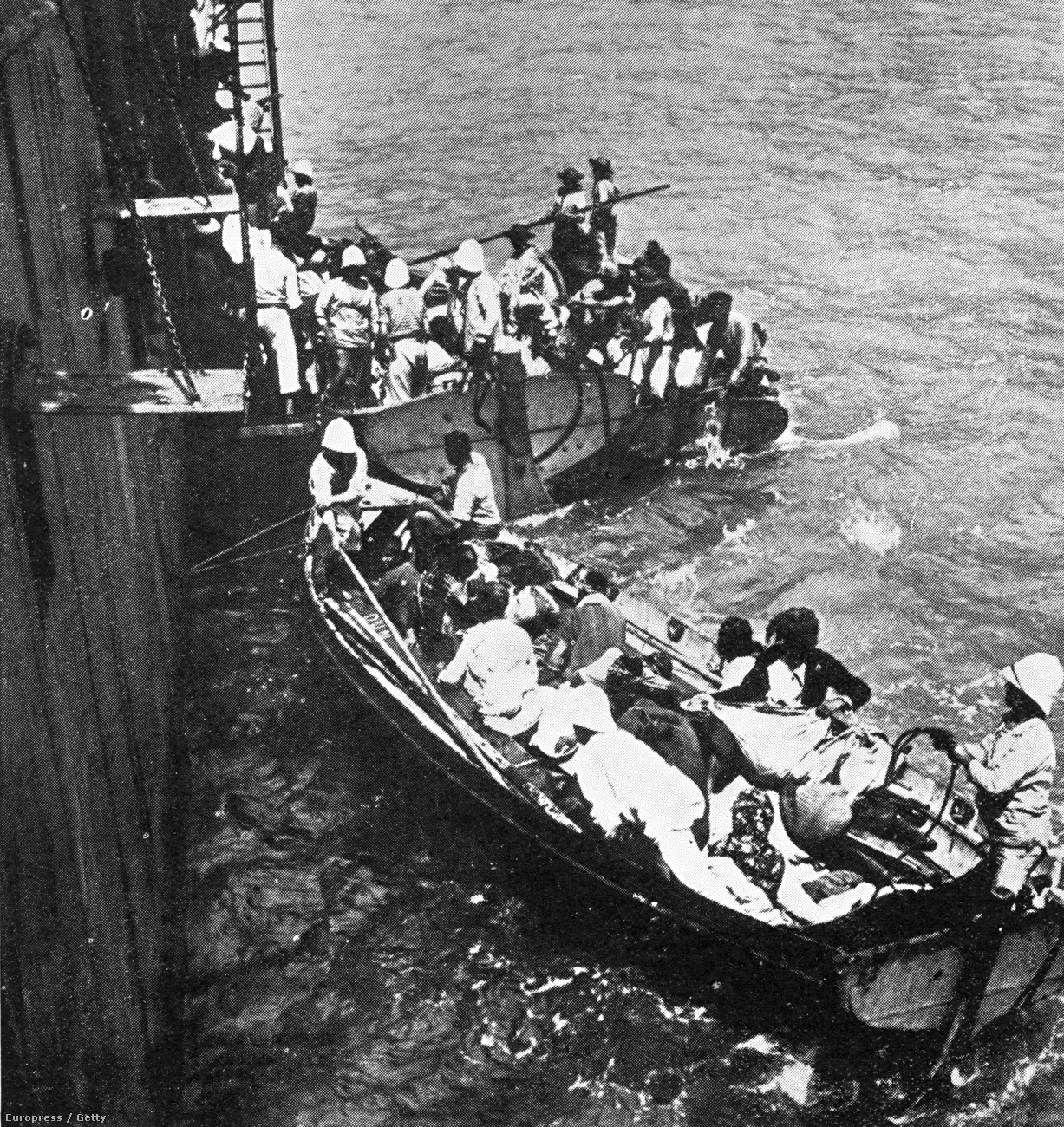
A French warship embarks Armenian refugees from Musa Dagh in September 1915.

On 5 September 1915, Armenians entrenched on Musa Dagh ("Mount Moses") to resist the Armenian genocide undertaken by the Ottoman Turks used a white bed sheet marked with a red cross to attract the attention of the French protected cruiser Guichen, which was operating north of the Bay of Antioch under the command of Captain Jean-Joseph Brisson. After Brisson brought the Armenians' desperate situation to his attention, Dartige du Fournet sought instructions from the French general staff. Receiving no clear answer, he took upon himself the responsibility for evacuating the Armenians, 4,080 of whom embarked on Guichen, the armored cruisers Amiral Charner and Desaix, the protected cruiser D'Estrées, and the seaplane carrier Foudre on 12 and 13 September 1915. The ships transported them to Port Saïd. Dartige du Fournet continues to be regarded as a hero by Armenians for his actions in September 1915.

On 10 October 1915, Dartige du Fournet replaced Vide Admiral Augustin Boué de Lapeyrère as Allied commander in the Mediterranean Sea. He became a Grand officer of the Legion of Honour on 8 January 1916. He directed the evacuation of the Serbian Army from Albania, which was completed in February 1916. He received the Croix de Guerre with palms, the citation reading, that he had "demonstrated the finest military qualities, both in the exercise of his current command and in those of the Algerian-Tunisian district and the 'Syrian Squadron.'"

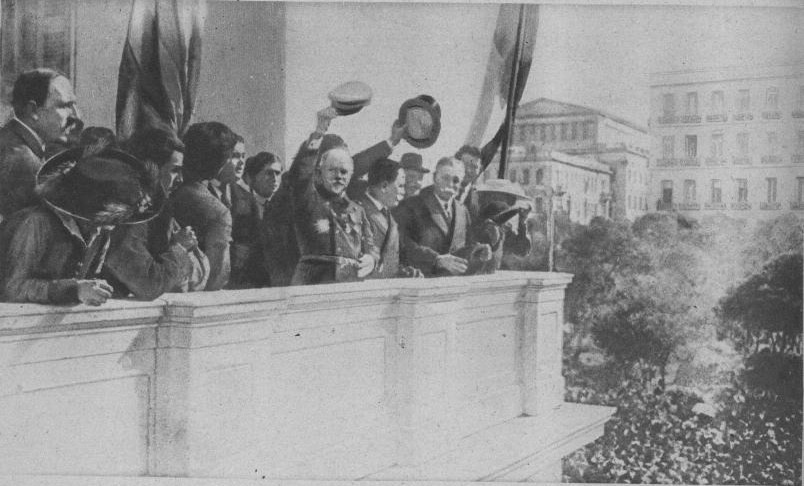
Dartige du Fournet in Piraeus, Greece, 26 November 1916.

After an Allied force had landed at Salonica in neutral Greece in September 1915 both to defend Salonica and support the hard-pressed Serbian Army in its struggle to defend Serbia against a Central Powers offensive, the National Schism developed in Greece between pro-Allied Prime Minister Eleftherios Venizelos and the pro-Central Powers King Constantine I. In the autumn of 1916, Venizelos and his supporters created a separate Greek government at Salonica, and the French then led Allied efforts to pressure Constantine I into a more pro-Allied stance. Although he disliked interfering in the affairs of a neutral country, Dartige du Fournet aboard his flagship, the battleship Provence, led a French naval squadron into the Bay of Salamis which seized and disarmed the Royal Hellenic Navy fleet on 11 October 1916. In late November 1916, the French demanded that the Greek royalist army provide arms and ammunition for pro-Allied Greek volunteers fighting on the Salonica front and, after the Greek government failed to comply, Dartige du Fournet steamed a French naval force into the harbor at Piraeus, Greece, on 1 December 1916 (18 November according to the Julian calendar then used in Greece) and went ashore with a landing party of French sailors in a show of force he believed would intimidate the Greek government into meeting the French demands, beginning what is known as the Noemvriana ("November Events") or "Greek Vespers." After Dartige du Fournet and his landing party reached Athens, the Greeks still refused to turn over any arms or ammunition and, to the surprise of the French, a battle broke out in which Dartige du Fournet and his party were cut off from the harbor. Torpedo boats and the French battleship Mirabeau shelled Athens to enable the French ashore to disengage. Dartige du Fournet finally negotiated a ceasefire after 70 French sailors were killed, and the vastly outnumbered French retreated to Piraeus and withdrew by sea on 3 December 1916.

Admiral Lucien Lacaze, the French Minister of the Navy, criticized Dartige du Fournet for refusing to bombard Athens more vigorously and accused him of weakness and recklessness. Lacaze relieved him of command on 11 December 1916 and replaced him with Admiral Dominique-Marie Gauchet on 12 December 1916. Dartige du Fournet transferred to the naval reserve in February 1917.

Dartige du Fournet sought to reintegrate into the French Navy during the last months of World War I. He was rehabilitated by the end of the war, but married and retired in 1918 to his villa, Paknam, in Périgueux, France.

=== Death ===
Dartige du Fournet died on 16 February 1940 at Périgueux. He is buried in Saint-Chamassy in Dordogne, France.

== Honors and awards ==
- Knight of the Legion of Honour, 28 December 1885
- Officer of the Legion of Honour, 31 August 1897
- Commander of the Legion of Honour, 10 July 1913
- Grand Officer of the Legion of Honour, 8 January 1916
- Croix de guerre 1914–1918 with palms

== Publications ==
- Instructions nautiques sur les mers de Chine. Introduction. Navigation générale. Collationnées par le service des instructions nautiques au Dépôt de la marine, 3 vol., Paris, Imprimerie nationale, 1883–1884
- Journal d'un commandant de la Comète: Chine, Siam, Japon (1892–1893), Paris, Plon-Nourrit, 1897

- Prix Auguste-Furtado de l’Académie française

- Petite Mousmé, Paris: Plon-Nourrit, 1907. Réédition: Paris, Pondichéry, Éditions Kailash, 2009 (novel originally published under the pseudonym "Gabriel Hautemer")
- Souvenirs de guerre d'un amiral, 1914–1916, Paris, Plon-Nourrit, 1920
- Heures lointaines. Souvenirs d'un marin, Paris, Plon, 1928
- À travers les mers. Souvenirs d'un marin, Paris, Plon, 1929
- Portraits de Famille. Souvenirs intimes, Périgueux, imprimerie Ribes, 14 rue Antoine-Gadaud, 1938

== In media ==
The French actor Jean Reno portrayed Dartige du Fournet in the American 2016 film The Promise.
