= Noemvriana =

1916 political dispute and conflict

- Part of the First World War and the National Schism
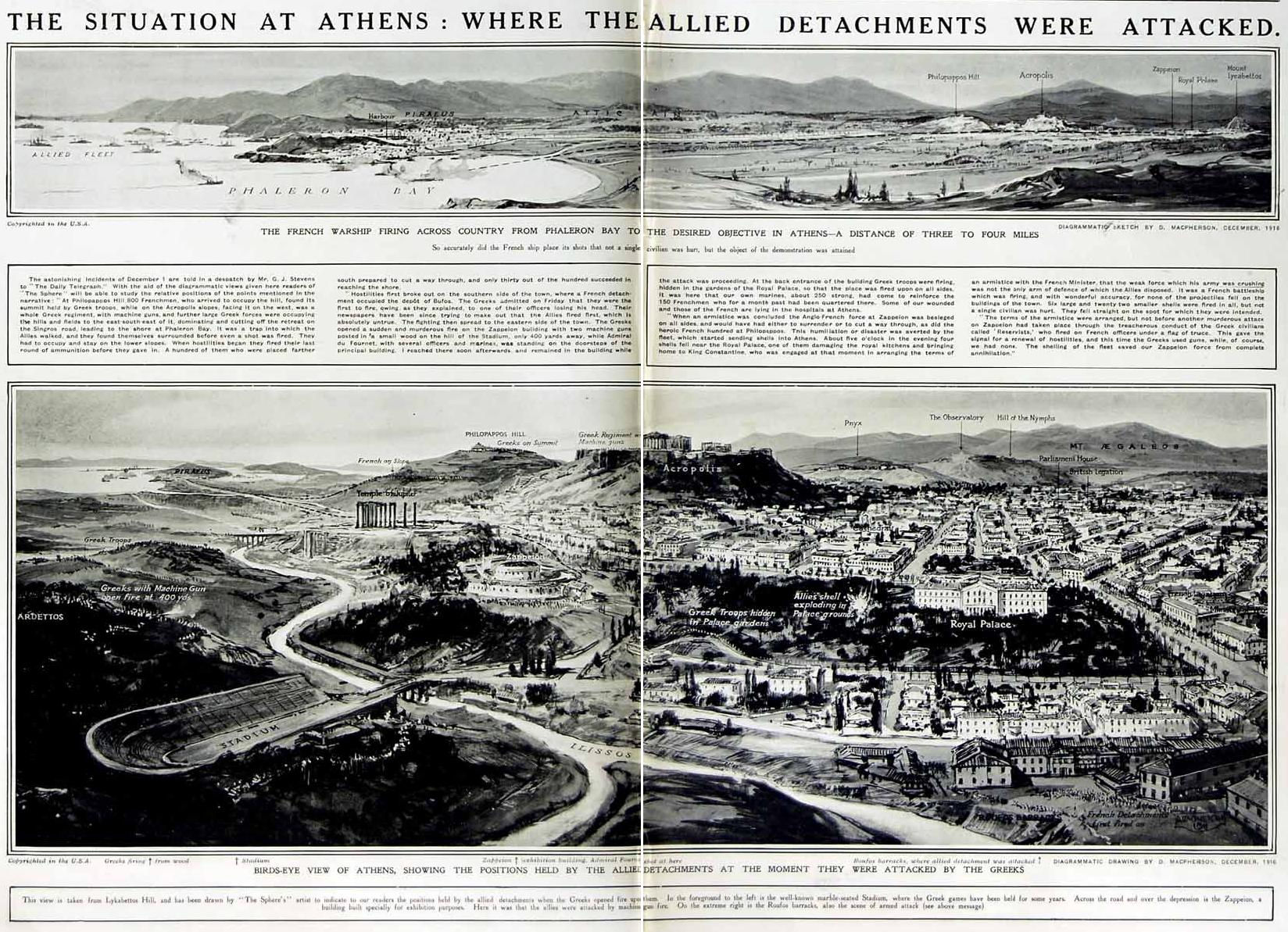
- Bird's-eye view of Athens and its suburbs during the Noemvriana clashes, published by The Sphere in December 1916
Date	1 December – 3 or 4 December 1916 [O.S. 18 November – 21 November 1916]
Location	Athens, Greece
Result	Royalist victory

Belligerents
Royalists	Allied Powers; France; British Empire; (Greece) Venizelists

Commanders and leaders
Ioannis Metaxas; Sofoklis Dousmanis; Anastasios Papoulas	Dartige du Fournet; Henri Pugliesi-Conti; C. D'O. Harmar

Units involved
Epistratoi; I Army Corps	Marines

Strength
More than 20,000	2,500

Casualties and losses
82	191–227
- c. 922 imprisonments; c. 980 expulsions; 14–35 dead and 14 injured citizens

The Noemvriana (Greek: Νοεμβριανά, "November Events") was an armed confrontation in Athens in December [O.S. November] 1916 between the Kingdom of Greece and the Allied Powers, arising from a dispute over Greece's neutrality in World War I, and followed by reprisals and riots against Greek supporters of the Allies.

The immediate crisis began in May 1916, when the Greek fortress of Roupel, on the northern border, was surrendered to the Central Powers, mainly Bulgarian forces. This raised concerns among the Allies of a secret alliance between the Greek government and the Central Powers. The Allies feared that the Central Powers, with Greek support, might launch an attack against the Franco-British army that had been invited to Thessaloniki by former Prime Minister Eleftherios Venizelos to assist Serbia and bivouacked there since late 1915. Diplomatic negotiations between King Constantine I and the Allies took place in mid-1916, with the King advocating for Greek neutrality, which would favor the Central Powers. The Allies demanded the demobilization of the Greek army to ensure Greece's neutrality after the surrender of Fort Roupel. However, the failure of negotiations, combined with the Bulgarian Army's advance in Macedonia, led to a military coup by pro-Allied Greek officers supporting Venizelos in Thessaloniki. Supported by the Allies, in October 1916, Venizelos established a provisional government in northern Greece to form an army to reclaim territories lost to Bulgaria, thus splitting Greece into two factions.

The involvement of the Hellenic Army alongside the Allies and the country's division sparked anti-Allied protests in Athens. In late October, King Constantine and the Allies reached a secret agreement on the war material compensation, but pressure from his military advisers forced the King to abandon it. On 1 December [O.S. 18 November] 1916, the Allies landed a small contingent in Athens to enforce their demands – surrender of war material equivalent to the ones lost at Roupel – but met with organized resistance. An armed confrontation ensued until a temporary compromise was reached. The next day, after the Allied forces evacuated, royalist mobs rioted in Athens, targeting Venizelos's supporters. The violence lasted two or three days after 1 December and became known as the Noemvriana, named after the November date in the Old Style calendar. This event drove deep social cleavage between the two sides and marked the height of the National Schism.

After Noemvriana, the Allies intensified efforts to remove King Constantine I. A naval blockade was imposed, isolating royalist areas, leading the population of Athens to starve. Following Constantine's abdication in June 1917, his son, King Alexander, ascended the throne, and Greece was united under Venizelos's leadership. Greece then joined the Allies in World War I, providing numerical superiority on the Macedonian front. In 1918, the Greek army had helped secure an Allied victory in the Balkans, contributing to the liberation of Serbia and the defeat of the Central Powers.

== Background ==
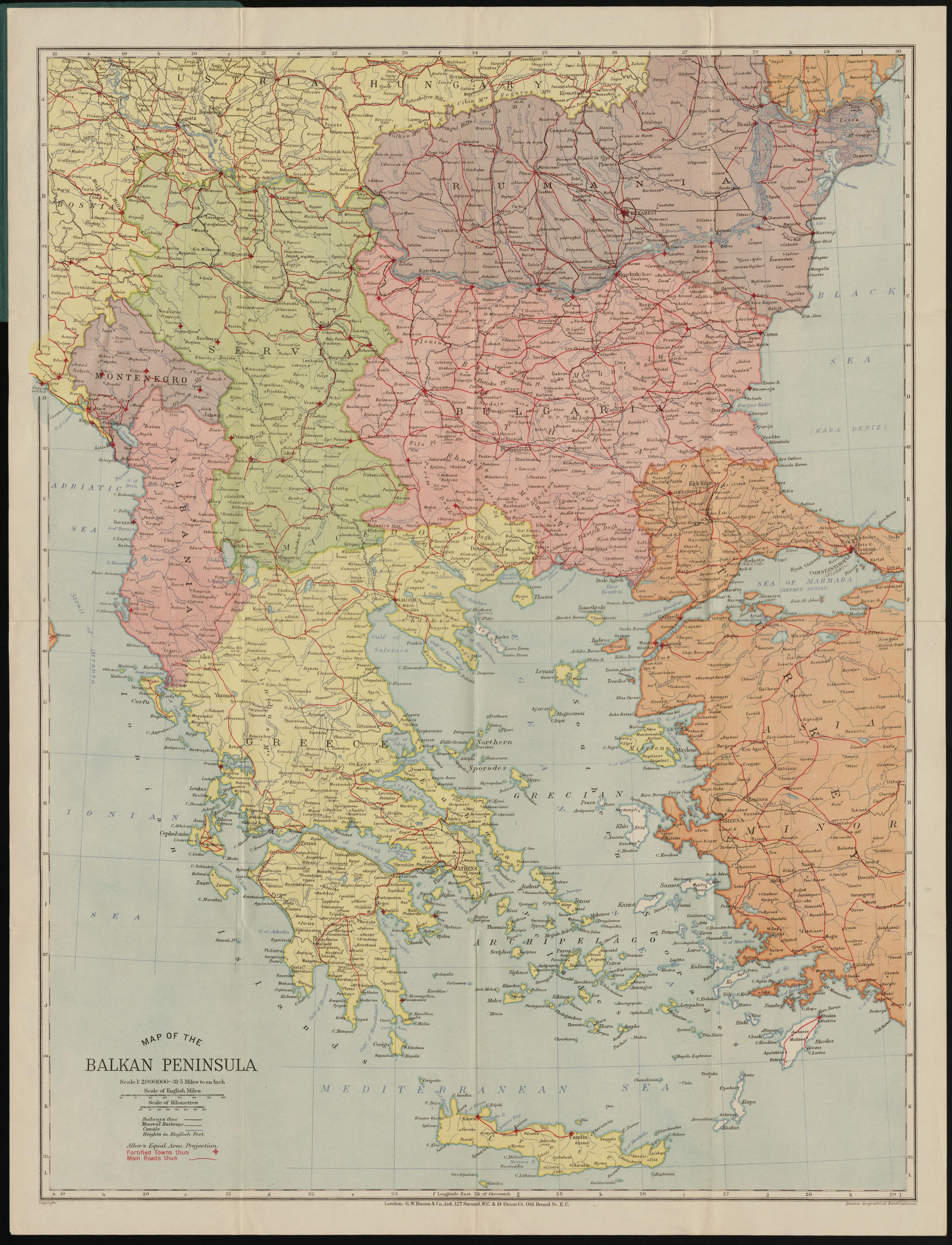
Map of the Balkan states in 1916

Greece emerged victorious after the 1912–1913 Balkan Wars, almost doubling its territory and population. However, the unstable international political climate of the early 20th century placed Greece in a difficult position. The ownership of the Greek-occupied eastern Aegean islands was contested by the Ottoman Empire, which claimed them as its own. In the north, Bulgaria, defeated in the Second Balkan War, was engineering revanchist strategies against Greece and Serbia. The assassination of Archduke Franz Ferdinand of Austria in Sarajevo precipitated Austria-Hungary's declaration of war against Serbia in 1914. This caused Germany and Austria-Hungary to declare war against countries allied with Serbia, which triggered the involvement of the Triple Entente and started World War I.

Greece, like Bulgaria, initially maintained neutrality during the conflict. The Greek leadership was divided between Prime Minister Eleftherios Venizelos, who supported Great Britain and the Allies, and King Constantine, who had been educated in Germany, was married to Sophia of Prussia, the sister of Kaiser Wilhelm II, and harbored strong sympathies for the Central Powers. Admiring Prussian militarism and anticipating a quick German victory, the King wanted Greece to remain neutral in the conflict, a strategy favorable to the Central Powers. Both men aspired to the prevailing Greek irredentist ideal, known since the mid-19th century as the Megali Idea, the revival of the Byzantine Empire with the capture of Constantinople and Asia Minor. Venizelos adopted an aggressive stance, recognizing the unique opportunities for territorial expansion created by the ongoing war in Europe, while the King favored a conservative approach encapsulated in the royalist slogan: "a small but honorable Greece".

In early 1915, Britain offered Greece "territorial concessions in Asia Minor" if it would participate in the upcoming Gallipoli Campaign. Venizelos supported this idea, while the King and his military advisers opposed it. Dismayed by the King's opposition, the prime minister resigned on 21 February 1915. A few months later, Venizelos's Liberal Party won the May elections and formed a new government. By that time, the Gallipoli campaign was faltering, and Serbia was in a precarious military situation.

When Bulgaria mobilized against Serbia on 23 September 1915, Venizelos persuaded the King to sign a decree for a Greek counter-mobilization as stipulated by the Greek–Serbian Alliance of 1913 and asked the Allies to defend Thessaloniki and aid Serbia without the King's explicit approval. The Greek parliament gave Venizelos a vote of confidence to help Serbia; however, the King refused to abandon the neutral position of Greece, which forced Venizelos to resign and led to the dissolution of parliament. The Liberals considered the King's actions unconstitutional, and they boycotted the December elections, escalating the animosity between Constantine and Venizelos as well as their loyal followers. The Allies, led by General Maurice Sarrail, landed at Thessaloniki on 5 October 1915 (hours before Venizelos's resignation) and entrenched around the city as it was vulnerable to a German–Bulgarian advance; the Allied army was reinforced at the end of the year with troops withdrawn from the Gallipoli campaign.

== Causes ==
=== Benevolent neutrality and the surrender of Fort Roupel ===
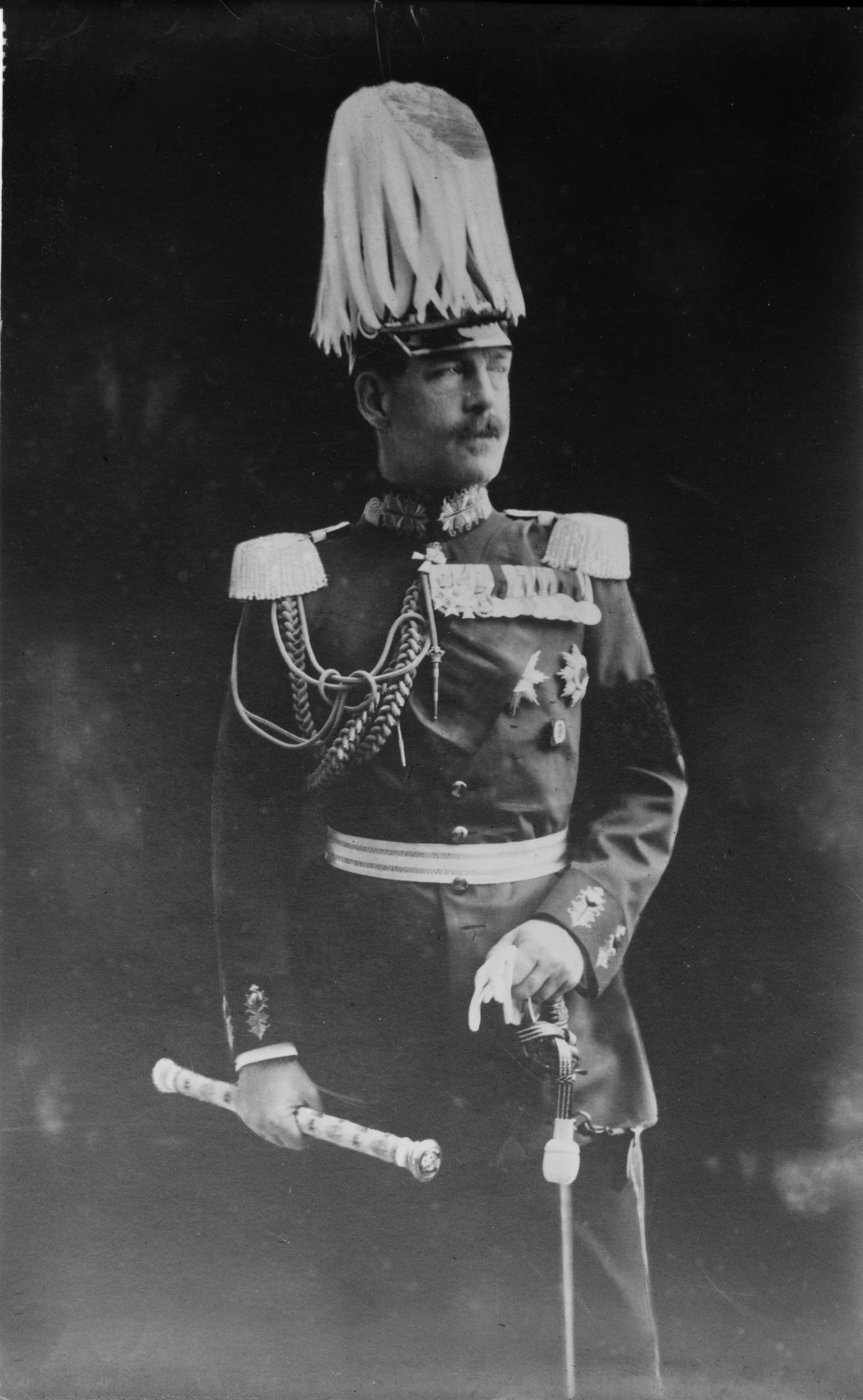
King Constantine I dressed as a German field marshal. His German sympathies caused him to favor a course of neutrality in the First World War.

After the resignation of Venizelos, the caretaker government under Alexandros Zaimis adopted a policy of "sincere benevolent neutrality" toward the Allies. Following the December elections, the government of Stefanos Skouloudis pledged to maintain this stance. In practice, however, his administration's decisions sought to appease the King and, by extension, aligned with German interests. The first indication of this came in April 1916, when Skouloudis refused an Allied request for Serbian troops stationed in Corfu to use the Greek railways from Corinth to Thessaloniki for their transfer to the Macedonian front. The Allies intended to tie-up Bulgarian troops, preventing their redeployment against Romania.

A month later, the German Supreme Command, concerned about the Allied general Sarrail's movements, leading German general Erich von Falkenhayn to occupy strategic positions inside Greek territory, specifically Fort Roupel. On 9 May 1916, Falkenhayn informed Athens of the imminent advance of German-Bulgarian forces. In reply, Athens minimized the significance of Sarrail's movements and requested that Falkenhayn change his strategy. On 23 May, Falkenhayn guaranteed that Greece's territorial integrity and its citizens' rights would be respected.

On 26 May, the Greek government was formally informed of the German-Bulgarian invasion of Greece, involving 25,000 Bulgarian soldiers led by German cavalry, which began later that day. Assurances were given to the Greek government that German-Bulgarian forces would not enter the towns of Serres, Drama, and Kavala, provided that Fort Roupel was occupied by the invading forces. The sudden approach of German-Bulgarian forces led to a delay to the German-Bulgarian advance, as the fort's Greek forces were prepared to defend it because they were not informed in advance by the government in Athens. In the afternoon, the fort's commander received orders from Athens to unconditionally surrender. Despite an official protest by the Greek government and the assurances of Falkenhayn, Bulgarian soldiers immediately began to forcibly round up the Greek population and move them into Serres, Drama, and Kavala. The Bulgarian plan was to later seize these cities and deport the Greeks, with a view to annexing the territory. German attempts to restrain Bulgarian territorial ambitions failed, leading to the occupation of Kavala by the Bulgarian Army on 4 September.

=== Reactions of Venizelos and the Allies ===
The surrender of Fort Roupel caused the Allies to believe that the German-Bulgarian advance was a result of a secret agreement between Athens and the Central Powers, as they had been assured by the Greek government that no Bulgarian force would invade Greek territory. The Allies saw this as a violation of Greek neutrality and a disturbance in the balance of power in the Balkans. The Allied press, especially in France, demanded swift military action against Greece to protect the Allied forces in Macedonia. On 3 June, Sarrail declared martial law in Thessaloniki, effectively stripping the Greek government of control over the city. Additionally, Italian concerns about relying on Greek forces to protect its flanks caused the withdrawal of Greek troops from Northern Epirus, resulting in Greece's loss of another region.

For Venizelos and his supporters, the surrender of Fort Roupel signaled the loss of Greek Macedonia. On 29 May, Venizelos proposed to Sir Francis Elliot (senior British diplomat in Athens) and Jean Guillemin (senior French diplomat in Athens) that he and General Panagiotis Danglis should establish a provisional government in Thessaloniki to mobilize a new Greek army to repel the Bulgarians. Venizelos pledged that the army would not move against the King and the royal family. According to Elliot's report, Venizelos hoped that the "success of his action and pressure of the public opinion might at the last moment convert His Majesty". The proposal had French support, but it met with strong opposition from Britain, forcing Venizelos to abandon the plan.

On 9 June, the Allies held a conference in London to examine the reasons for the rapid surrender of Fort Roupel and favored the complete demobilization of the Greek army and navy. King Constantine anticipated the results of the conference and ordered a partial demobilization on 8 June. The tension between the royal government and the Allies continued since anti-Allied activities in Athens were ignored by the Greek government. On 12–13 June, a mob destroyed the offices of Venizelist (supporting Venizelos) newspapers, Nea Ellas, Patris, Ethnos, and Estia. The mob proceeded to the British Legation as police stood idly by. This incident gave France the political ammunition to persuade Britain that more extreme measures were needed. On 17 June, the London conference decided "that it was absolutely necessary to do something to bring the King of Greece and his Government to their senses".

On 21 June, the Allies demanded that the Greek government and parliament be dissolved, new elections be held, and the Greek army be demobilized. The government complied by beginning the army's demobilization, initially scheduling elections for August before postponing them to October. The demands were intended to re-establish Venizelos as head of government. On 25 August, the King, attempting to appease the Allies, dismissed the chief of the General Staff, Viktor Dousmanis. However, polarization intensified, where both factions organized demobilized soldiers into reservist groups: the royalist National Reservists League, organized by Captain Ioannis Metaxas, and the Venizelist National League of Greek Reservists, organized by General Danglis.

=== Military coup of Thessaloniki ===
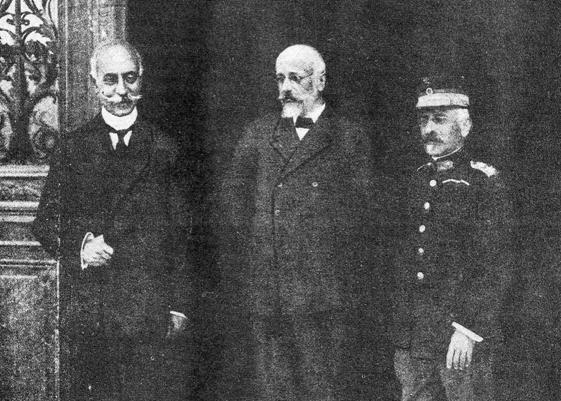
The "Triumvirate of National Defence": (L–R) Admiral Kountouriotis, Venizelos, and General Danglis

On 27 August 1916, Venizelos explained his disagreements with the King's policies during a demonstration in Athens. Venizelos said that the King had become a victim of his advisers, whose aims were to destroy the achievements of the Goudi revolution. Additionally, he appealed to the King to pursue a policy of benevolence and true neutrality. He ended his speech by stating that "if this proposal does not lead to success, then there are other means to protect the country from complete catastrophe". The King refused to accept any compromise, declining to even meet with a committee sent by Venizelos.

Two days later, army officers loyal to Venizelos organized a military uprising in Thessaloniki to force Venizelos's hand in establishing a provisional government in Thessaloniki. Venizelos criticized this course of action, noting that without the support of the Allied army, the movement would fail immediately. This further polarized the population between the Venizelists and royalists (also known as anti-Venizelists). The newly founded separate "provisional state" included the "New Lands", which were won during the Balkan Wars, whose population broadly supported Venizelos, while the pre-1912 "Old Greece" (mainly Athens and the Peloponnese) was mostly pro-royalist. Venizelos, Admiral Pavlos Kountouriotis, and General Danglis formed a triumvirate provisional government and, on 9 October, moved to Thessaloniki to assume command of the National Defence and the formal establishment of the provisional government. They directed Greek participation in the Allied war effort in conflict with the royal wishes in Athens. Venizelos's initiatives changed the attitude of the Allied authorities in Greece with respect to the negotiations with the royalist government in Athens. According to a correspondence from British diplomats Albert Charles Wratislaw (located in Thessaloniki) to Francis Elliot (located in Athens):

Not only has Mr. Venizelos' action put fresh spirit into its promoters here [Thessaloniki], but it has encouraged recruits to come forward from Macedonia where, as I have reported, very little enthusiasm had hitherto been manifested... The Committee of National Defence must now have at its disposal nearly twenty thousand men.

From the outset, Venizelos continued his appeals to the King to join forces to liberate Macedonia jointly. He wrote:

...I think that the political orientation of the movement is very clear. We want to build an army in order to recover... the territories occupied by our hated enemy and fulfill our treaty obligations to Serbia, and thus removing the stigma from the face of our nation. After this, and naturally, when the war is over, we shall request the convocation of a [national] assembly, not to change the structure of the state, or the dynasty, or restrict the prerogatives of the Crown as stipulated in the constitution, but in order to explain, elucidate, and safeguard these prerogatives as much as possible so that no King in the future will tell the representatives of the popular sovereignty that in the great national questions, he was right to disregard the popular will and to impose his own views because he considers himself responsible before God.

Despite Venizelos's moderation, he failed to convince many citizens who, while wary of the King's policies, were equally fearful of Venizelos's perceived ambition of abolishing the dynasty. It was only after the Noemvriana that he pushed for a radical solution to end the stalemate.

== Constantine–Bénazet agreement ==
After the creation of the provisional government in Thessaloniki, negotiations between the Allies and the King intensified. The Allies wanted further demobilization of the Greek army and the removal of military forces from Thessaly to ensure the safety of their troops in Macedonia. The King wanted assurances that the Allies would not officially recognize or support Venizelos's provisional government, and he wanted guarantees that Greece's integrity and neutrality would be respected. After several unproductive negotiations, on 23 October, the King suddenly agreed to some of the demands made by the Allies, including the removal of the Greek army from Thessaly. The King also pledged war materiel and the support of the Greek navy. In exchange, he requested Paul Bénazet, a member of the French parliament who had been authorized to conduct discussions with the King, to keep this agreement secret from the Central Powers.

On 3 November, Vice Admiral Louis Dartige du Fournet, commander-in-chief of the Allied Mediterranean fleet, used the sinking of two Greek merchant ships by a German submarine and the secret agreement to demand the surrender of the docked Greek warships and Allied control over the Salamis naval arsenal. The Greek government yielded, and on 7 November, the partial disarmament of Greek warships began. The Allies towed away 30 lighters. Three weeks later, the French took over the Salamis naval base completely and began using Greek ships with French crews.

The Constantine–Bénazet agreement was short-lived due to Venizelos's military plans and pressure exerted by the military in Athens, led by the King, regarding the forced Greek disarmament. The army of the Provisional Government of National Defence confronted the royalist army at Katerini. This action at Katerini was met with some disapproval among the Allied circles and Venizelos's own associates in Athens. Answering these criticisms, he wrote:

I am certainly very sorry that our advance to Katerini has caused displeasure among the foreigners [the Allies] and criticism among our friends there. But our friends should allow me to say that they are suffering from incurable conservatism, which, had it influenced us, would have rapidly succeeded in stifling our movement due to lack of life. For the foreigners, whose friendly feelings I do not doubt, it is natural to think only of their own difficulties and to ignore ours.

The Venizelist advance was not an attempt to undermine the King's pact with Bénazet since it had been planned long before that. The failure of the secret agreement was caused by subversive activities (such as infiltration to incite desertions, justifying the arrests of Venizelists) within segments of the royalist government in Athens to paralyze and disrupt the Thessaloniki provisional government.

== Last diplomatic efforts before the events ==
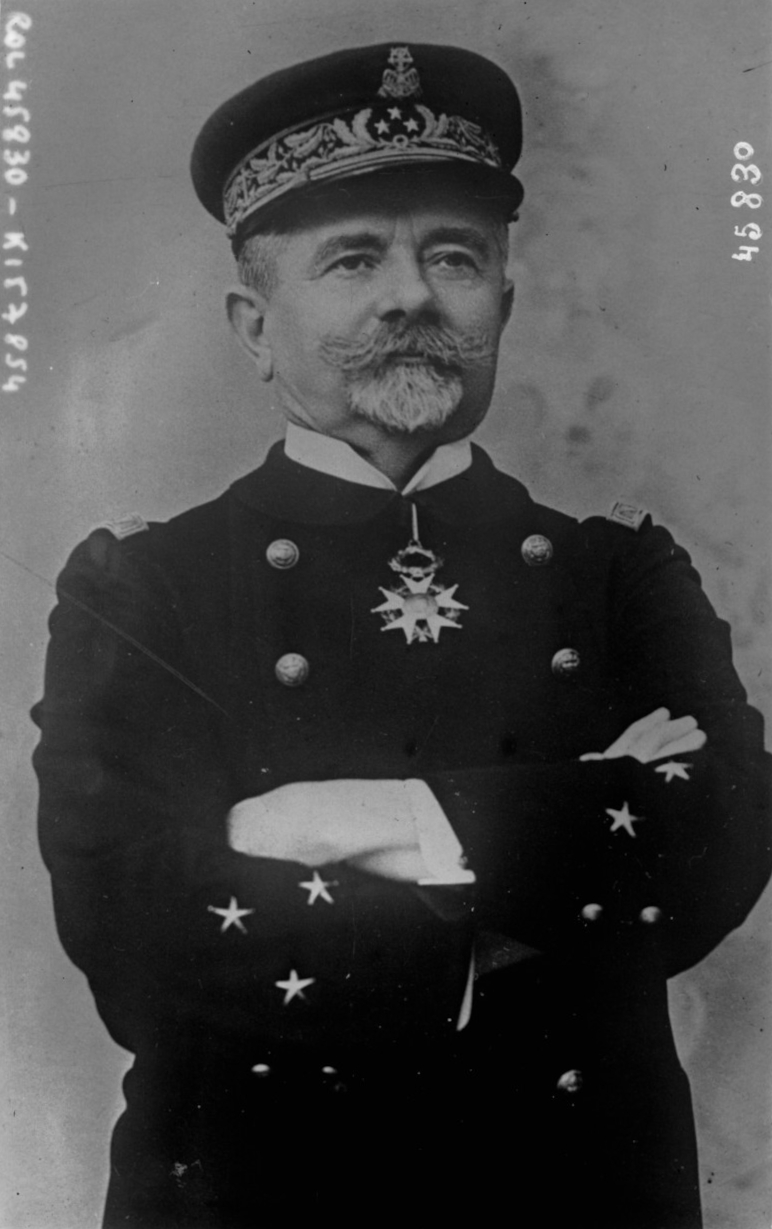
French Vice Admiral Louis Dartige du Fournet

The seizure of Greek ships by the Allies, the Katerini incident, and the Franco-British violations of Greece's territorial integrity offended the national honor of a segment of "Old Greece" and increased the King's popularity. The King refused to honor his secret agreement with Bénazet, and soldiers who requested to fight against the Bulgarian occupation were charged with "desertion to the rebels". Metaxas and Sofoklis Dousmanis had been leading a movement among lower-ranking officers to resist disarmament and the transfer of any materials to the Allies.

Diplomacy failed despite continuing pressure applied by the Allies against Athens, prompting du Fournet to instruct all diplomats of hostile states to leave Athens on 19 November 1916. On 24 November, du Fournet presented a seven-day ultimatum demanding the surrender of at least ten Greek mountain artillery batteries to counterbalance those which had been captured by the Central Powers with the loss of Fort Roupel. Du Fournet was instructed by his government not to use force to take possession of the batteries. The Admiral made a last effort to persuade the King to accept France's demands. He warned the King that his forces would occupy certain positions in Athens until Greece accepted all the demands. The King said that the citizens of Greece, as well as the army, were against disarmament and promised only that the Greek forces would not attack the Allies.

Despite the gravity of the situation, neither the royalist government nor the Allies made any serious effort to reach a diplomatic solution. On 29 November, the royalist government rejected the Allies' proposal, and armed resistance was organized. By 30 November, military units (I Army Corps) and royalist militia (the epistratoi, "reservists") from surrounding areas had been recalled and gathered in and around Athens (in total over 20,000 men) and occupied strategic positions, with orders not to fire unless fired upon. The Allied commanders underestimated Greek resolve, causing them to conclude that the Greeks were bluffing. The Allies thought that in the face of a superior force, Greeks would "bring the cannons on a platter" (surrender), as described by the French naval intelligence service officer in Athens, Henri de Roquefeuil, and it was a viewpoint shared by du Fournet.

== Battle of Athens ==
In the early morning of 1 December [O.S. 18 November] 1916, the Allies landed a 2,500-strong French and British marine force in Piraeus that headed towards Athens. The commander of the landing party was French captain Henri Pugliesi-Conti, who had received orders to secure strategic positions around Athens and to avoid using violence; the British troops were under the command of Major C. D'O. Harmar. When the Allied troops reached their designated positions, they found them already occupied by Greek troops. For more than two hours, both sides stood facing each other. Sometime in the morning, a rifle shot of unknown origin was fired, and the Battle of Athens began. Each side blamed the other for firing first. Once the battle spread throughout the city, the King requested a ceasefire, proposing a compromise. Du Fournet was unprepared for organized Greek resistance, as he was outnumbered and had few supplies, so he readily accepted the King's proposal. However, before an agreement was finalized, the battle resumed. The Greek battery on Ardittos Hill fired a number of rounds at the entrance of Zappeion, where the French admiral had established his headquarters. The Allied squadron from Phaliron responded by bombarding sections of the city, mostly around the stadium and near the palace. Discussions soon resumed, and a final compromise was reached. The King agreed to surrender six mountain batteries rather than the ten demanded by du Fournet, but the fate of the remaining materiel was left undecided. By late afternoon, the battle was finished. According to historian George Leon, the Allies had suffered 194 casualties, dead and wounded, and the Greeks lost 82 (wounded and dead), not counting civilians; later analysis provides different numbers. By the early morning of 2 December, all Allied forces had been evacuated.

Military scenes during and after the Noemvriana
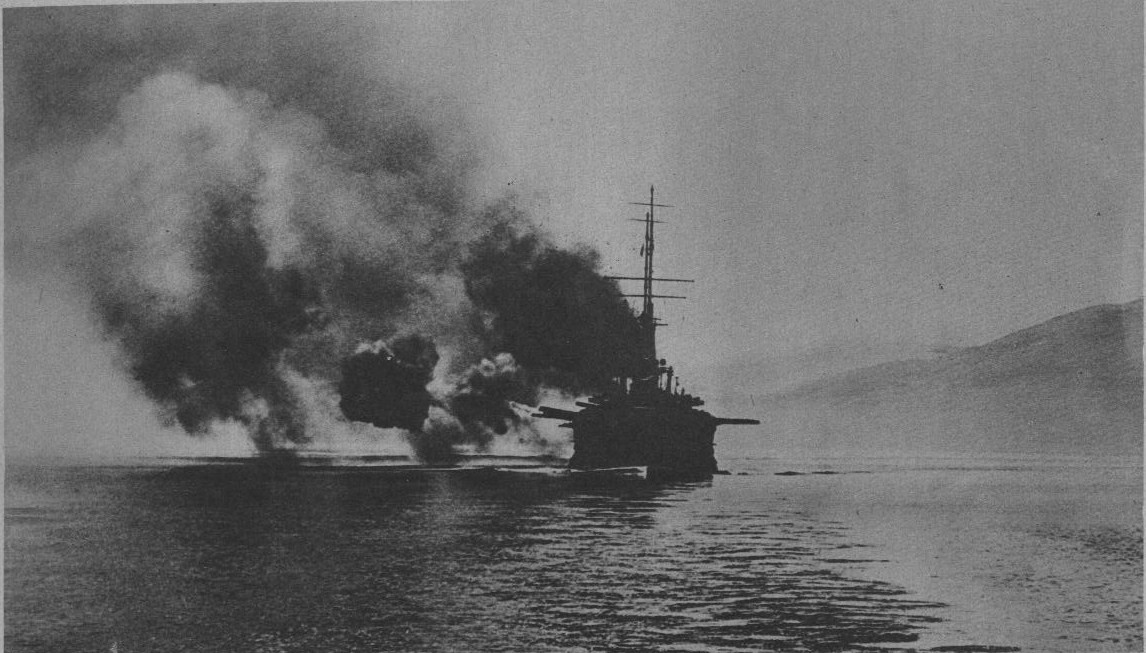
The French battleship Mirabeau bombarding Athens

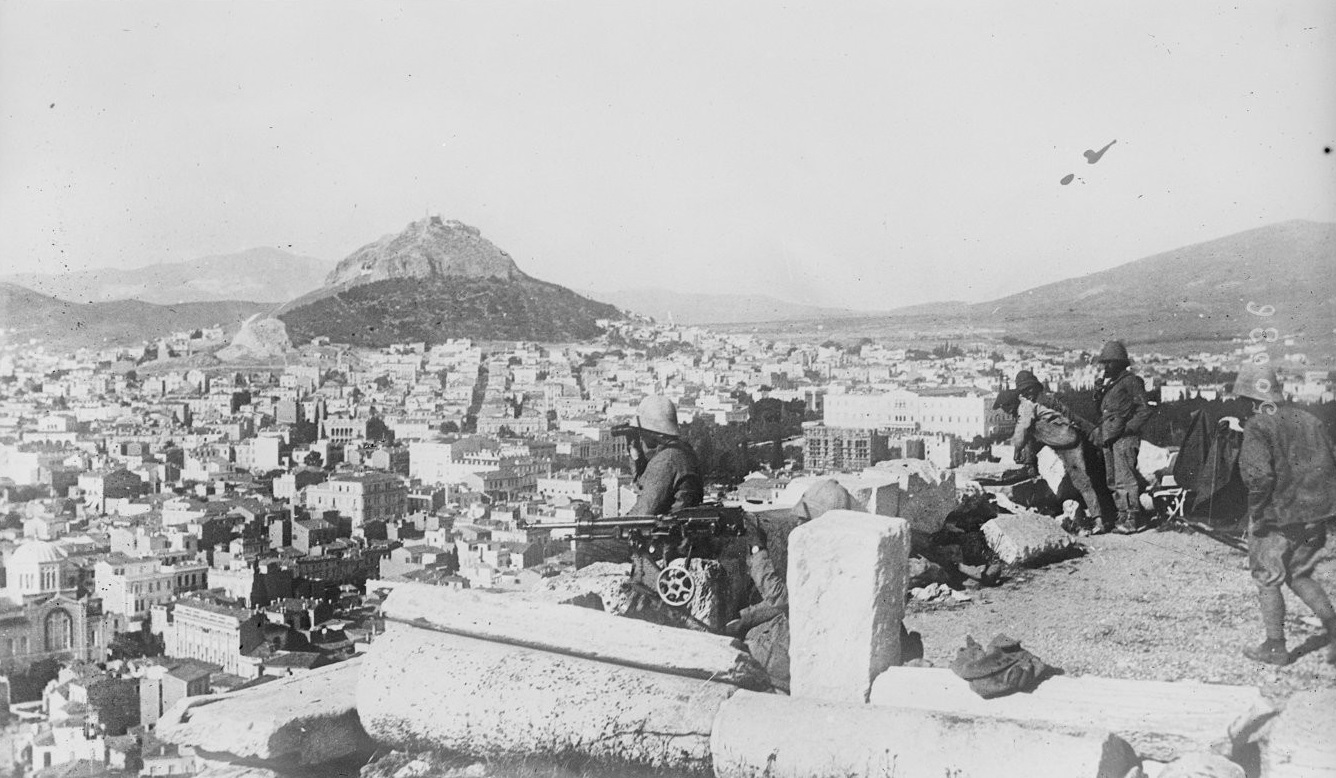
French troops with machine guns in Athens

French troops in Athens, with the Acropolis in the background

The role of Venizelists during the battle is contested. Du Fournet wrote in his report that he had been involved in a civil war. Contemporary writer George F. Abbott considers the royalist claim of Venizelists' participation (firing from rooftops and balconies on patrolling royalist troops) as probable. Abbott claimed that large caches of weapons and ammunition were found in Venizelist strongholds, packed in French military containers and Venizelists were led to prison surrounded by a furious mob, guarded by the royal army. Pavlos Karolidis, a contemporary royalist historian, argues that no Venizelist attacked their fellow citizens and the only weapons found during the raids on prominent Venizelists' houses were knives.

=== The following days ===
The authorities used the events as a pretext, claiming that the Venizelists had staged an insurrection with the support of Allied troops and made, with the help of the Reservists, extensive arrests and reprisals against them. The entire operation was led by two army generals; troops of the military district of Athens took orders from General Konstantinos Kallaris, and the rest were commanded by General Anastasios Papoulas. The terror and destruction that followed soon got out of hand, making even the respectable conservative newspaper Politiki Epitheorisis (Greek: Πολιτική Επιθεώρηση, Political Review), which at the beginning urged Greek "justice" to "smite mercilessly the atrocious conspiracy" and to purge all followers of the "arch-conspirator of Salonika [Venizelos]", in the end, urge "prudence".

There are different reports of casualties and damage during the following days. According to historian George Leon, over the following two or three days, the houses and shops of Venizelists were ransacked, with 35 people murdered and 980 citizens expelled from Athens by the Epistratoi. Historian Giannis Mourelos estimates that 14 civilians were killed and another 14 were wounded. Many hundreds were imprisoned and kept in solitary confinement; Mourelos estimates the number of imprisonments to be 922 throughout Greece. Prominent Venizelists, such as Emmanuel Benakis (mayor of Athens), were imprisoned. Political observer Vincent J. Seligman writes that the imprisoned Venizelists were released only 45 days later, after a strong demand contained within the Entente ultimatum, which was accepted on 16 January. Abbott asserts that during the evacuation of the Allied forces, there was an exchange of prisoners, which included people on the payrolls of different Allied spy agencies, and they slipped out of Athens at night after allegedly having "terrorized [the city] for nearly a year".

On 3 December, the Athenian population gathered in Piraeus to witness the funeral of the fallen Allied soldiers; representatives of the Entente powers were present as well. The bodies were buried at the Anastaseos cemetery (Resurrection cemetery) in Keratsini, near Piraeus, in an area inside the Catholic cemetery reserved for France. Later, the remains were repatriated to France in 1922.

== Aftermath ==
This incident became known in Greece as Noemvriana and marked the culmination of the National Schism. Although the fighting was confined to Athens, the consequences that followed contributed to the Allied victory.

=== Political situation in Greece and Europe ===
On 2 December 1916, Britain and France officially recognized Venizelos's government as the only lawful government of Greece. On 7 December, Venizelos's government officially declared war on the Central Powers. Meanwhile, in Athens, Constantine praised his generals, and his supporters circulated various pro-royalist and religious brochures calling Venizelos a "traitor". A royal warrant for the arrest of Venizelos was issued, and the Archbishop of Athens, pressured by the royal house, anathematized Venizelos in a special ceremony with the crowd throwing stones at his effigy on 25 December.

In France, the premiership of Aristide Briand, a leading proponent of engaging with Constantine to reconcile the two Greek administrations, was threatened by the events in Athens, leading to the reorganization of the French government. Du Fournet was relieved of his command on 12 December and replaced by Vice Admiral Dominique-Marie Gauchet. In Britain, Prime Minister H. H. Asquith and Foreign Minister Sir Edward Grey resigned and were replaced by Lloyd George and Arthur Balfour. The change in the British leadership proved to be particularly important for Greece since Lloyd George was a known Hellenophile and admirer of Venizelos, with a particular interest in resolving the Eastern Question.

The Allies imposed a strict naval blockade of Athens on 8 December to pressure the King into accepting their demands, causing food shortages among the Athenian population. The King resisted despite the rise in the number of deaths by starvation. The fall of Tsar Nicholas II in Russia, who had previously refused the French proposals for Constantine's removal from the throne, caused France and Great Britain to take more drastic measures against King Constantine. In June 1917, they decided to invoke their right as "Protecting Powers" and demanded the King's resignation; Charles Jonnart, authorized by the Allied governments, directed French forces to take control of the Isthmus of Corinth and Thessaly, ensuring the upcoming harvest would not fall into the hands of the King. Constantine accepted the demands on 12 June and went into exile in Switzerland. His second son Alexander became the new king of Greece instead of Constantine's eldest son and crown prince, George, who was considered to have German sympathies. Following Constantine into exile were many prominent royalist officers and politicians considered pro-German, such as Metaxas and Dimitrios Gounaris, who went to France and Italy respectively.

Moments after the Noemvriana
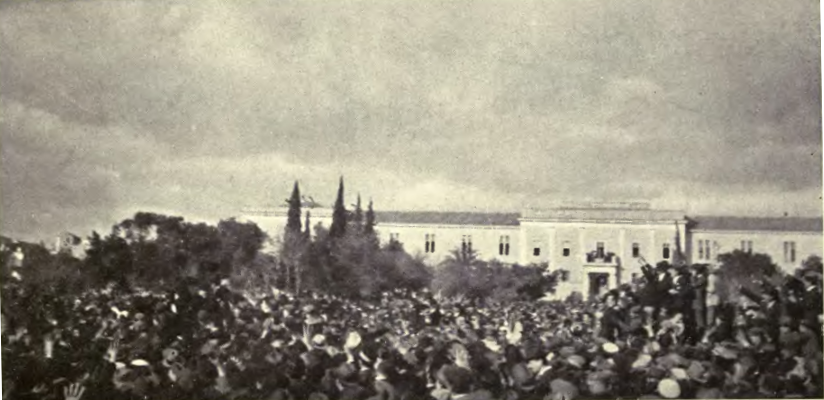
"Anathema to traitor Venizelos" by the crowd in Athens, December 1916

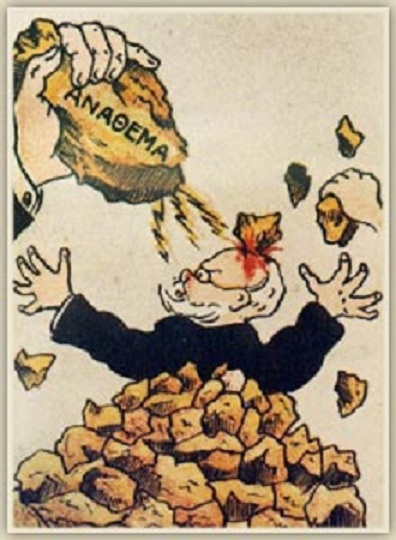
Antivenizelist poster, December 1916

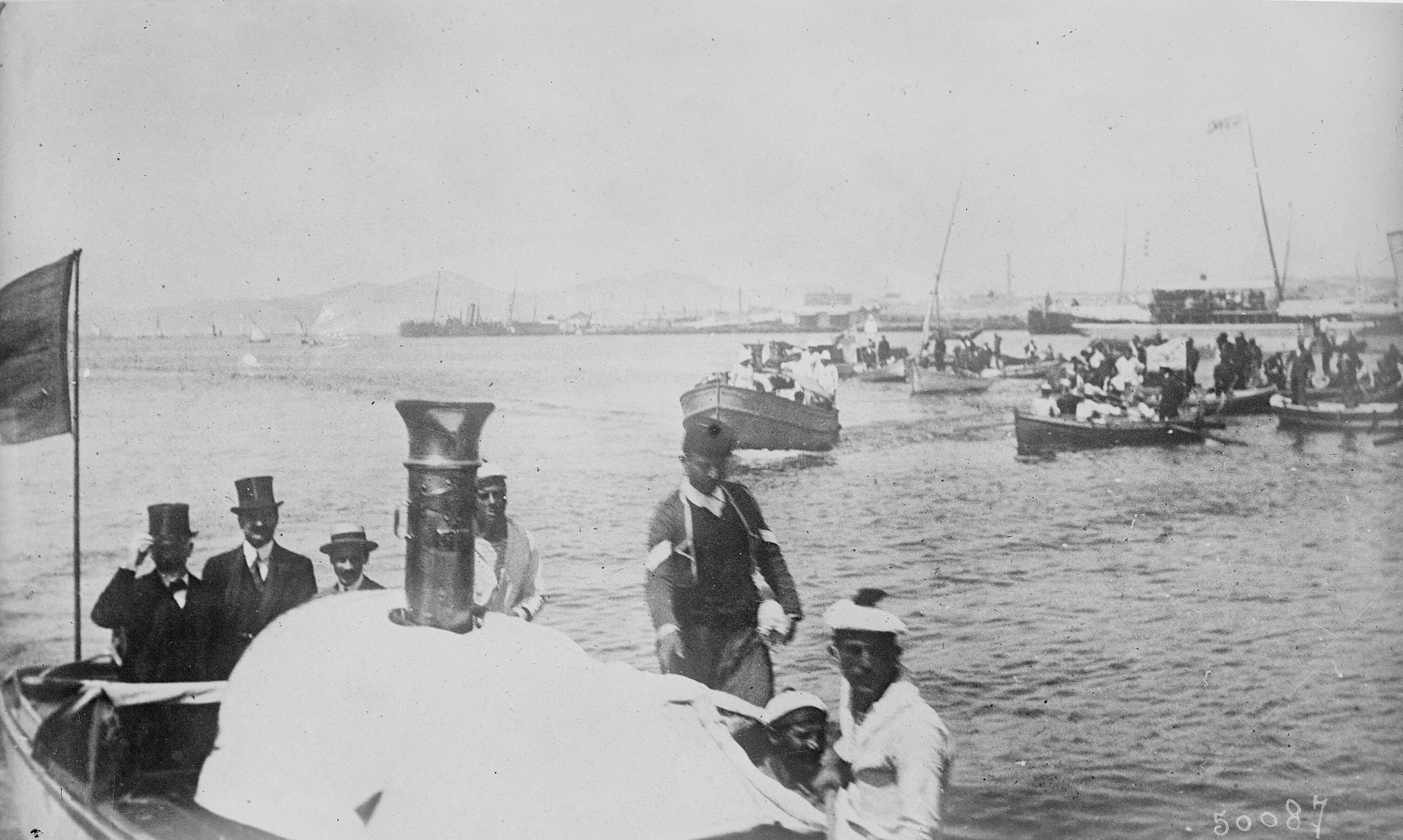
The arrival of Venizelos to Athens, June 1917, after the departure of Constantine

=== The Macedonian front ===
The events paved the way for Venizelos to return to Athens under French military escort on 25 June 1917. On 28 June, Venizelos formed a new government. Greece, now unified, officially joined the war on the side of the Allies. The entire Greek army was mobilized, although tensions remained inside the army between supporters of Constantine and supporters of Venizelos, and Greece commenced military operations against the Central Powers on the Macedonian front.

In the autumn of 1918, the Greeks, with 150,000 soldiers, were the single largest component of the Allied army on the Macedonian front. The Greek army had given the Allies a much-needed advantage, altering the balance on the Macedonian front. The Battle of Skra-di-Legen in May 1918 signaled to the Allies that the Greeks were ready to assume an offensive role. On 14 September 1918, under the command of French General Franchet d'Esperey, a combined Greek, Serbian, French, and British force launched a major offensive against the Bulgarian and German army, where the Bulgarian Army gave up its defensive positions and began retreating towards their country. On 30 September, the armistice with Bulgaria was signed by the Allied command.

The Allied army pushed north and defeated the remaining German and Austrian forces. Through October 1918, the Allied armies advanced significantly towards Serbia and, on 1 November, the Serbian capital, Belgrade, was liberated. They were preparing to invade Hungary, but the offensive was halted when the Hungarian government requested and signed an armistice in early November 1918. The participation of the Greek army at the Macedonian front was one of the decisive events of the war, earning Greece, under Venizelos, a seat at the Paris Peace Conference.

== Footnotes ==
=== Notes ===
1. This number is an estimate by historians Thanos Veremis and Helen Gardikas-Katsiadakis. Contemporary authors George Abbott and Vincent Seligman reported 3,000 and 2,000, respectively.
2. There is disagreement between the official numbers. Captain Pugliesi-Conti gave a report to Dartige du Fournet on 9 December 1916 that included 57 dead and 134 injured. Dartige du Fournet, in his memoir, reported the numbers as 60 dead and 167 injured. However, when the French and British governments submitted a request to the Greek government for compensation in October 1918, their report listed 50 French fatalities and 77 French injuries, with no casualties reported by the British government.
3. Greece gained most of Macedonia, Epirus, Crete, and other Aegean islands, following its conflict with the Ottoman Empire during the Balkan Wars. As a result, its territory and population increased from 25,014 square miles (64,790 km^{2}) to 41,993 square miles (108,760 km^{2}) and from approximately 2.7 to 4.8 million, respectively.
4. Bulgaria and the Ottoman Empire aligned themselves with Germany, and following the occupation of Serbia, Greece was the only remaining non-aligned nation in the Balkans. If Greece chose to remain neutral, Germany and Austria would have had a secure route to the Porte and the territories of the Middle East.
5. The initial British proposal to Greece offered the region of Northern Epirus and then vaguely promised as an attractive alternative the area around Smyrna in Asia Minor, on the condition that Greece cede the district of Kavala to Bulgaria as part of the Entente's broader strategy to rebuild a Balkan Confederation against the Central Powers. Britain harbored doubts about the latter, fearing that it might antagonize Italy, which controlled the Dodecanese Islands and held ambitions in Asia Minor. Venizelos favored expansion into Asia Minor for its prosperity and large Greek population of nearly one million. However, the King's officers warned of the difficulties in defending territories spread across Macedonia and Asia Minor.
6. The most pronounced intervention by the Allies was when they occupied the island of Corfu and used it as a base to gather the remains of the Serbian army. The Allies informed Athens of their intention a few hours before the first ships reached the island.
7. Bulgarian forces expelled around 42,000 Greeks from the regions of Kavala, Serres, and Drama, forcing them to endure a week-long journey into exile in overcrowded freight wagons. Approximately 12,000 of those deported died during the ordeal. The survivors were then forced to work long hours daily, constructing roads, laying railway tracks, and building fortifications.
8. The incident is described as the Noemvriana, meaning 'November events', based on its date in the Old Style calendar; Greece adopted the Gregorian calendar in 1923.
9. After the Greek War of Independence, Britain, France, and Russia became the Protecting Powers of the newly founded Greek state. The three countries provided loans for the establishment of the Greek state, formalized at the London Conference of 1832 and in subsequent treaties, which granted the Protecting Powers the right to intervene in the affairs of Greece if their interests were in danger.

== Sources ==
=== Contemporary books ===
- Abbott, George F. (1922). Greece and the Allies 1914–1922. London: Methuen & Co. OCLC 785125782.
- Chester, Samuel M. (1921). Life of Venizelos, with a Letter from His Excellency M. Venizelos (PDF). London: Constable. OCLC 344631.
- Du Fournet, Dartige (1920). Souvenirs de Guerre d'un Amiral (in French). Paris: Plon-Nourrit. OCLC 1185501.
- Gibbons, Herbert A. (1920). Venizelos. Boston: Houghton Mifflin Company. OCLC 1405251432.
- Newbolt, Henry (1928). Naval Operations. Vol. IV. London: Longmans Green and Co. OCLC 47100532.
- Paparrigopoulos, Constantine; Karolidis, Pavlos (1932). Η Ιστορία του Ελληνικού Εθνούς [The History of the Greek People] (in Greek). Vol. VI (part B). Athens: Eleutheroudakis. OCLC 1040349003.
- Paxton, Hibben (1920). Constantine I and the Greek People. New York: The Century Co. OCLC 3025099.
- Seligman, Vincent J. (1920). Victory of Venizelos (PDF). London: George Allen & Unwin Ltd. OCLC 2026415.

=== Modern books ===
- Burg, David F.; Purcell, L. Edward (1998). Almanac of World War I. Lexington: University Press of Kentucky. ISBN 978-0-8131-9087-7. OCLC 39210195.
- Clogg, Richard (2013). A Concise History of Greece. Cambridge: Cambridge University Press. ISBN 978-1-107-03289-7. OCLC 862962305.
- Dutton, David (1998). The Politics of Diplomacy: Britain and France in the Balkans in the First World War. London: I. B. Tauris. ISBN 978-1-3501-8298-1. OCLC 39797584.
- Fischer, Fritz (1967). Germany's Aims in the First World War (PDF). New York: W. W. Norton Company. SBN 393-09798-6.
- Fotakis, Zizis (2005). Greek Naval Strategy and Policy, 1910–1919. London: Routledge. ISBN 0-415-35014-X. OCLC 7390557217.
- Hall, Richard C. (2010). Balkan Breakthrough, The Battle of Dobro Pole 1918. Bloomington, Indiana: Indiana University Press. ISBN 978-0-253-35452-5.
- Jukes, Geoffrey; Simkins, Peter; Hickey, Michael (2003). First World War. Vol. 4: The Mediterranean Front 1914–1923. New York: Routledge. ISBN 0-415-96844-5. OCLC 52375688.
- Kitromilides, Paschalis, ed. (2006). Eleftherios Venizelos: The Trials of Statesmanship. Edinburgh: Edinburgh University Press. ISBN 978-0-7486-3364-7. OCLC 71325883.
  - Veremis, Thanos; Gardikas-Katsiadakis, Helen. "Protagonist in Politics, 1912-1920". In Kitromilides (2006), pp. 115–134.
  - Nakakis, Andreas. "Venizelos and State-Church Relations". In Kitromilides (2006), pp. 346–376.
  - Smith, Michael Llewellyn. "Venizelos' Diplomacy, 1910–23: From Balkan Alliance to Greek–Turkish Settlement". In Kitromilides (2006), pp. 136–192.
  - Agriantoni, Christine. "Venizelos and Economic Policy". In Kitromilides (2006), pp. 284–318.
- Koliopoulos, John S.; Veremis, Thanos M. [in Greek] (2009). Modern Greece A History Since 1821. Oxford: Wiley-Blackwell. ISBN 978-1-4051-8681-0. OCLC 587391543.
- Leon, George B. (1974). Greece and the Great Powers 1914–17. Thessaloniki: Institute of Balkan Studies. LCCN 75309809. OCLC 1304874.
- Liakos, Antonis [in Greek]; Doumanis, Nicholas (2023). The Edinburgh History of the Greeks, 20th and Early 21st Centuries: Global Perspectives. Edinburgh: Edinburgh University Press. ISBN 978-1-4744-1084-7. OCLC 1370616267.
- Markezinis, Spyros (1968). Σύγχρονη πολιτική ιστορία της νεότερης Ελλάδας [Political History of Modern Greece] (in Greek). Vol. 4. Athens: Papyros. OCLC 690837729.
- Mavrogordatos, George [in Greek] (1983). Stillborn Republic Social Coalitions and Party Strategies in Greece, 1922–1936. Berkeley: University of California Press. ISBN 0-520-04358-8. OCLC 8283124.
- Mourelos, Giannis (2007). Τα "Νοεμβριανά" του 1916 [The "Noemvriana" of 1916] (in Greek). Athens: Pataki. ISBN 978-960-16-2571-3. OCLC 212400727.
- Smith, Michael Llewellyn (1998). Ionian Vision, Greece in Asia Minor, 1919–1922. Michigan: University of Michigan Press. ISBN 0-472-08569-7. OCLC 39655340.
- Stevenson, David (2005). Cataclysm The First World War as Political Tragedy. New York and Cambridge: Basic Books. ISBN 0-465-08185-1.
- Theodoulou, Christos A. (1971). Greece and the Entente, August 1, 1914 – September 25, 1916. Thessaloniki: Institute for Balkan Studies. OCLC 1472050.
- Vatikotes, Panayiotis (1998). Popular Autocracy in Greece, 1936–41: a Political Biography of General Ioannis Metaxas. London: Routledge. ISBN 978-0-714-64445-5. OCLC 37890370.

=== Journals ===
- Carabott, Philip J. (1993). "The temporary Italian occupation of the Dodecanese: a prelude to permanency". Diplomacy and Statecraft. 4 (2): 285–312. doi:10.1080/09592299308405886.
- Duggan, Stephen P. (1917). "Balkan Diplomacy II". Political Science Quarterly. 32 (2): 224–251. doi:10.2307/2141731. JSTOR 2141731.
- Frazer, James G. (1917). "The cursing of Venizelos". Folklore. 28 (2): 133–140. doi:10.1080/0015587x.1917.9718973.
- Lemonidou, Elli (2018). "Heritage and Memory of the First World War in Greece during the Interwar Period". Balcanica (49): 221–236. doi:10.2298/BALC1849221L.
- Papaioannou, Christos (2024). "Skra Victory (1918): Greece's Military, Political, and Social Gain". British Journal of Philosophy, Sociology and History. 4 (1): 19–24. doi:10.32996/pjpsh.2024.4.1.3.
- Taillemite, Étienne (1996). "L'imbroglio grec et l'affaire d'Athènes". Revue historique des Armées (in French). 203 (2): 27–38.
- "Our Astronomical Column". Nature. 111: 546. 1923. doi:10.1038/111546a0.

=== Newspapers and magazines ===
- "Tα ξεχασμένα Νοεμβριανά" [The forgotten Noemvriana]. Kathimerini (in Greek). 18 November 2006. Archived from the original on 20 July 2011.
- "Greece: Land of Invasion". TIME. 4 November 1940.
- "The Greek Attack on the Allies". The Advertiser (Adelaide). 6 December 1916. p. 7.

=== Web sources ===
- Theodorakis, Emanouil; Manousakis, George (2004). "First World War 1914–1918" (in Greek). National Research Foundation "Eleftherios K. Venizelos". Archived from the original on 29 February 2004.
- Foster, Samuel (2019). "Propaganda at Home and in Exile (South East Europe)". International Encyclopedia of the First World War. Berlin: Freie Universität Berlin. doi:10.15463/ie1418.11321/1.1.
- "Places of Memory – Pereaus". Consulate of France in Athens (in French). Archived from the original on 3 March 2016.
