= Constantine I of Greece =

King of Greece (1913–17; 1920–22)

Constantine I
- Constantine I in 1914

King of the Hellenes
- First reign: 18 March 1913 – 11 June 1917
- Inauguration: 21 March 1913
- Predecessor: George I
- Successor: Alexander
- Second reign: 19 December 1920 – 27 September 1922
- Predecessor: Alexander (Note: Queen Mother Olga as Regent)
- Successor: George II
- Born: 2 August 1868; Athens, Kingdom of Greece
- Died: 11 January 1923 (aged 54); Palermo, Kingdom of Italy
- Burial: 14 January 1923 Naples, Italy 22 November 1936 Royal Cemetery, Tatoi Palace, Athens, Greece
- Spouse: Sophia of Prussia (m. 1889)
- Issue: George II, King of Greece; Alexander, King of Greece; Helen, Queen Mother of Romania; Paul, King of Greece; Irene, Duchess of Aosta; Princess Katherine
- Greek: Κωνσταντίνος Αʹ (Konstantínos I)
- House: Glücksburg
- Father: George I of Greece
- Mother: Olga Constantinovna of Russia
- Military career
- Allegiance: Kingdom of Greece; German Empire
- Branch: Hellenic Army; Imperial German Army
- Rank: Field marshal
- Unit: German Imperial Guard
- Commands: Army of Thessaly; Army of Epirus; Commander-in-Chief of the Hellenic Army
- Conflicts: See list: Greco-Turkish War (1897); Battle of Domokos; Balkan Wars; First Balkan War; Battle of Sarantaporo; Battle of Yenidje; Battle of Bizani; Second Balkan War; Battle of Kilkis–Lachanas; Battle of Doiran; Battle of Demir Hisar; Battle of Kresna Gorge; Greco-Turkish War (1919–1922); Battle of Kütahya–Eskişehir; 1922 Constantinople crisis

Constantine I (Greek: Κωνσταντίνος Αʹ, romanized: Konstantínos I; 2 August [O.S. 21 July] 1868 – 11 January 1923) was King of Greece from 18 March 1913 to 11 June 1917 and again from 19 December 1920 to 27 September 1922. The eldest son of George I of Greece, he succeeded to the throne following his father's assassination in 1913.

Educated in Greece and later in Germany, Constantine was an admirer of Prussian militarism. As the crown prince, he was commander-in-chief of the Hellenic Army during the unsuccessful Greco-Turkish War of 1897. Later and under the leadership of Prime Minister Eleftherios Venizelos, he led successfully the Greek forces in the Balkan Wars of 1912–1913, in which Greece expanded, doubling in area and population.

He was married to Sophia of Prussia, a younger sister of Wilhelm II, the Emperor of Germany. During his reign, Constantine's pro-German aligned interests led him to twice refuse Venizelos' popular elected mandates for Greece to join World War I on the side of the Allies. Constantine unconstitutionally dismissed his Prime Minister, causing the National Schism. The country was split between the pro-Venizelos New Greece (lands of recently liberated in the Balkan Wars) and the royalist Old Greece, driving deep social cleavages and brought Greece to the brink of civil war. In late 1916, his pro-German policies led to the unconditional surrender of Fort Roupel and the loss of much of newly conquered Macedonian territories to Bulgaria. Also his military staff organized paramilitary units to terrorize Venizelos' supporters, and these groups opened fire against Allied troops in Athens in an incident later known as the Noemvriana. After a five-month naval blockade of Athens by France and Great Britain that caused famine, Constantine abdicated, despite strong popular support for continued resistance. His second son, Alexander, succeeded him. After Alexander's death, Venizelos' defeat in the 1920 legislative elections, and a plebiscite in favor of his return, Constantine was reinstated.

The royalist governments that succeeded Venizelos, continued the unsuccessful Greco-Turkish War of 1919–1922 that ended in the irrevocable destruction of Greek communities in Asia Minor. Constantine I abdicated the throne in favor of his eldest son George II in September 1922, after an army revolt of Venizelist officers. He went to exile, dying in Sicily, Italy on 11 January 1923.

== Early life ==
Constantine was born on 2 August 1868 in Athens. He was the eldest son of King George I and Queen Olga. His birth was met with an immense wave of enthusiasm: the new heir apparent to the throne was the first Greek-born member of the family. As the ceremonial cannon on Lycabettus Hill fired the royal salute, huge crowds gathered outside the Palace shouting what they thought should rightfully be the newborn prince's name: "Constantine". This was both the name of his maternal grandfather, Grand Duke Konstantin Romanov of Russia, and the name of the "King who would reconquer Constantinople", the future "Constantine XII, legitimate successor to the Emperor Constantine XI Palaiologos", according to popular legend. He was inevitably christened "Constantine" (Greek: Κωνσταντῖνος, Kōnstantīnos) on 12 August, and his official style was the Diádochos (Διάδοχος, Crown Prince, literally: "Successor"). The most prominent university professors of the time were handpicked to tutor the young Crown Prince: Ioannis Pantazidis taught him Greek literature; Vasileios Lakonas mathematics and physics; and Constantine Paparrigopoulos history, infusing the young prince with the principles of the Megali Idea. On 30 October 1882 he enrolled in the Hellenic Military Academy. After graduation he was sent to Berlin for further military education, and served in the German Imperial Guard. Constantine also studied political science and business in Heidelberg and Leipzig. In 1890 he became a Major general, and assumed command of the 3rd Army Headquarters (Γʹ Αρχηγείον Στρατού) in Athens.

== Olympics and confrontations with Trikoupis ==
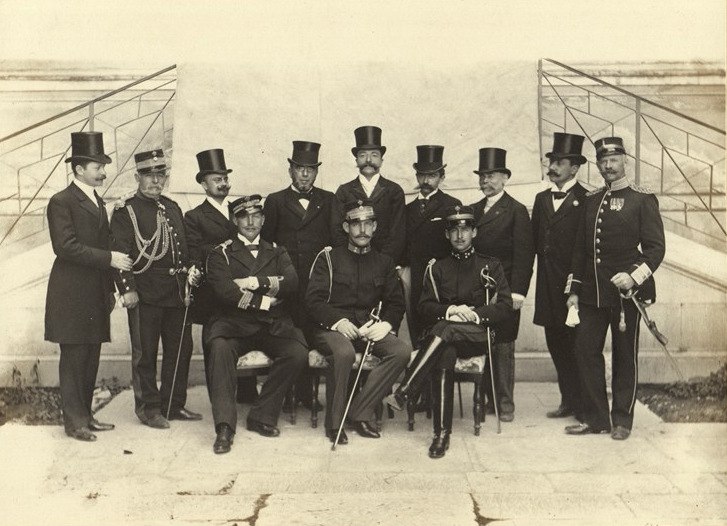
Constantine as member of the international committee for organization of the 1896 Summer Olympics.

In January 1895, Constantine caused political turmoil when he ordered army and gendarmerie forces to break up a street protest against tax policy. Constantine had previously addressed the crowd and advised them to submit their grievances to the government. Prime Minister Charilaos Trikoupis asked the King to recommend that his son avoid such interventions in politics without prior consultation with the government. King George responded that the Crown Prince was, in dispersing protesters, merely obeying military orders, and that his conduct lacked political significance. The incident caused a heated debate in Parliament, and Trikoupis finally resigned as a result. In the following elections Trikoupis was defeated, and the new prime minister, Theodoros Deligiannis, seeking to downplay hostility between government and the Palace, regarded the matter closed.

The organization of the first modern Olympics in Athens was another issue which caused a Constantine-Trikoupis confrontation, with Trikoupis opposed to hosting the Games. After Deligiannis's electoral victory over Trikoupis in 1895, those who favored a revival of the Olympic Games, including the Crown Prince, prevailed. Subsequently, Constantine was instrumental in the organization of the 1896 Summer Olympics; according to Pierre de Coubertin, in 1894 "the Crown Prince learned with great pleasure that the Games will be inaugurated in Athens." Coubertin assured that "the King and the Crown Prince will confer their patronage on the holding of these Games." Constantine later conferred more than that; he eagerly assumed the presidency of the 1896 organizing committee. At the Crown Prince's request, wealthy businessman George Averoff agreed to pay approximately one million drachmas to fund the restoration of the Panathinaiko Stadium in white marble.

== Greco-Turkish War and aftermath ==
Constantine was the commander-in-chief of the Army of Thessaly in the Greco-Turkish War of 1897, which ended in a humiliating defeat. In its aftermath, the popularity of the monarchy fell, and calls were raised in the army for reforms and the dismissal of the royal princes, and especially Constantine, from their command posts in the armed forces. The simmering dissent culminated in the Goudi coup in August 1909. In its aftermath, he and his brothers were dismissed from the armed forces, only to be reinstated a few months later by the new prime minister, Eleftherios Venizelos, who was keen on gaining the trust of King George. Venizelos was ingenious in his argumentation: "All Greeks are rightly proud to see their sons serve in the army, and so is the King". What was left unsaid was that the royal princes' commands were to be on a very tight leash.

== Balkan Wars ==
=== Overview ===
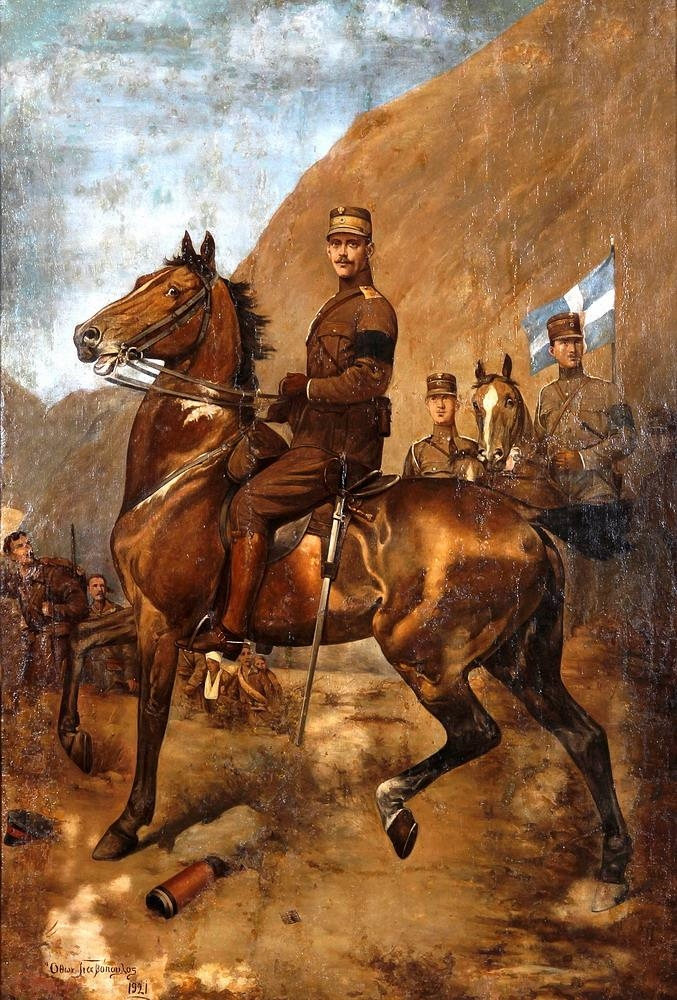
King Constantine I during the Second Balkan War

In 1912 with the formation of the Balkan League, Greece was ready for war against the Ottoman Empire and Prince Constantine became Chief of the Hellenic Army.

Ottoman planning anticipated a two-prong Greek attack east and west of the impassable Pindus mountain range. They accordingly allotted their resources, equally divided, in a defensive posture to fortify the approaches to Ioannina, capital of Epirus, and the mountain passes leading from Thessaly to Macedonia. This was a grave error. The war plan by Venizelos and the Greek General Staff called for a rapid advance with overwhelming force towards Thessaloniki with its important harbor. A small Greek force of little more than a division, just enough to forestall a possible Turkish redeployment eastwards, was to be sent west as the "Army of Epirus".

At the same time the bulk of the Greek infantry and artillery made a rapid advance against the Turks in the east. In the event, the Greek plan worked well. Advancing on foot, the Greeks soundly defeated the Turks twice, and were in Thessaloniki within 4 weeks. The Greek plan for overwhelming attack and speedy advance hinged upon another factor: should the Hellenic Navy succeed in blockading the Turkish fleet within the Straits, any Turkish reinforcements from Asia would have no way of quickly reaching Europe. The Ottomans would be slow to mobilize, and even when the masses of troops raised in Asia were ready, they were able to go no further than the outskirts of Constantinople, fighting the Bulgarians in brutal trench warfare. With the Bulgarians directing the bulk of their force towards Constantinople, the capture of Thessaloniki would ensure that the railway axis between these two main cities was lost to the Turks, causing loss of logistics and supplies and severe impairment of command and control capability. The Turks would be hard placed to recruit locals, as their loyalties would be liable to lie with the Balkan Allies. Ottoman armies in Europe would be quickly cut off and their loss of morale and operational capability would lead them toward a quick surrender.

=== Macedonian Front ===
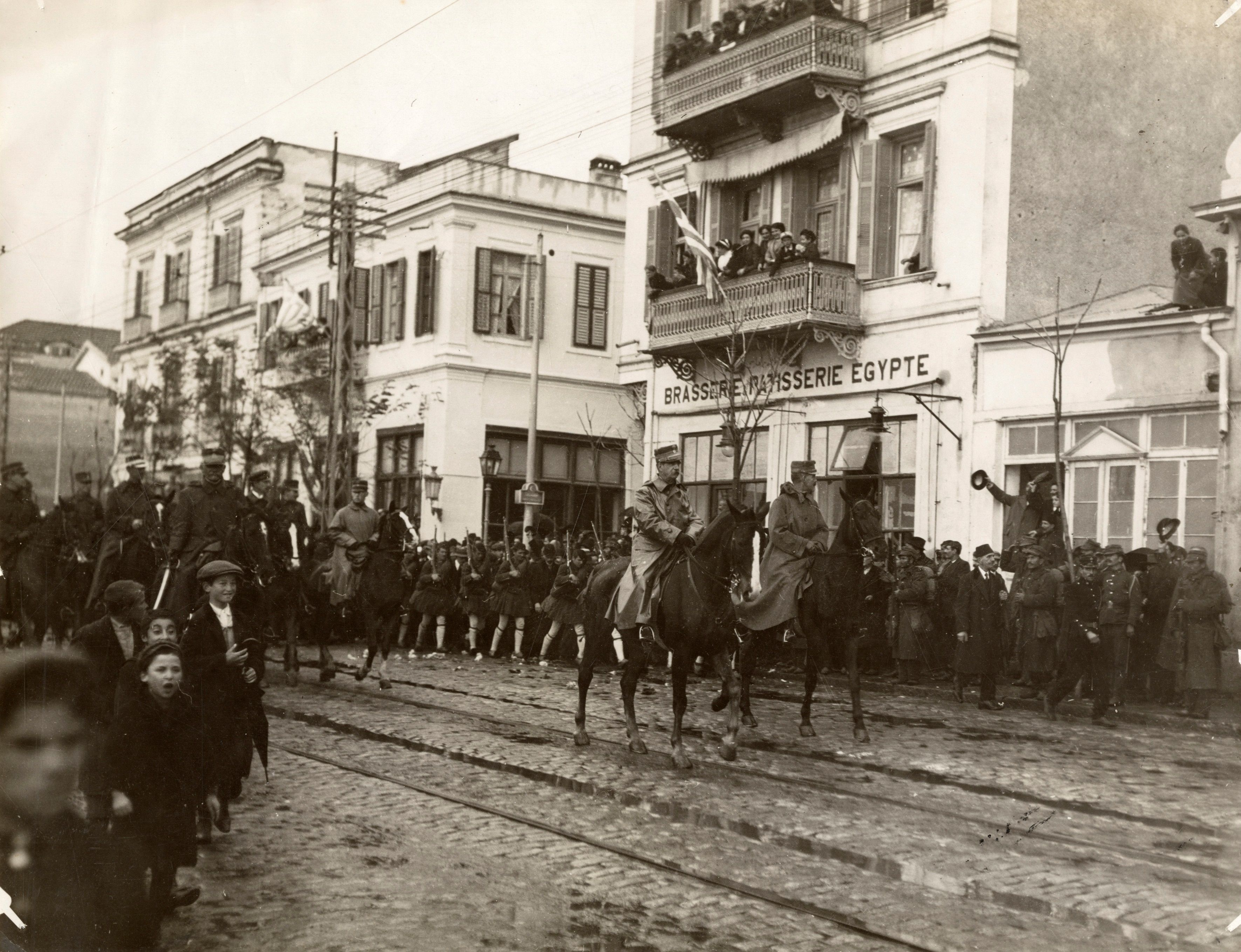
Constantine with George I and the Greek Army enter Thessaloniki

Previously the Inspector General of the Army, Constantine was appointed commander-in-chief of the "Army of Thessaly" when the First Balkan War broke out in October 1912. He led the Army of Thessaly to victory at Sarantaporos. At this point, his first clash with Venizelos occurred, as Constantine desired to press north, towards Monastir, where the bulk of the Ottoman army lay, and where the Greeks would rendezvous their Serb allies. Venizelos, on the other hand, demanded that the army capture the strategic port city of Thessaloniki, the capital of Macedonia, with extreme haste, so as to prevent its fall to the Bulgarians. The dispute resulted in a heated exchange of telegrams. Venizelos notified Constantine that "... political considerations of the utmost importance dictate that Thessaloniki be taken as soon as possible". After Constantine impudently cabled: "The army will not march on Thessaloniki. My duty calls me towards Monastir, unless you forbid me", Venizelos was forced to pull rank. As prime minister and war minister, he outranked Constantine and his response was famously three words long, a crisp military order to be obeyed forthwith: "I forbid you". Constantine was left with no choice but to turn east, and after defeating the Ottoman army at Giannitsa, he accepted the surrender of the city of Thessaloniki and of its Ottoman garrison on 27 October (O.S.), less than 24 hours before the arrival of Bulgarian forces who hoped to capture the city first.

The capture of Thessaloniki against Constantine's whim proved a crucial achievement: the pacts of the Balkan League had provided that in the forthcoming war against the Ottoman Empire, the four Balkan allies would provisionally hold any ground they took from the Turks, without contest from the other allies. Once an armistice was declared, then facts on the ground would be the starting point of negotiations for the final drawing of the new borders in a forthcoming peace treaty. With the vital port firmly in Greek hands, all the other allies could hope for was a customs-free dock in the harbor.

=== Epirus Front ===
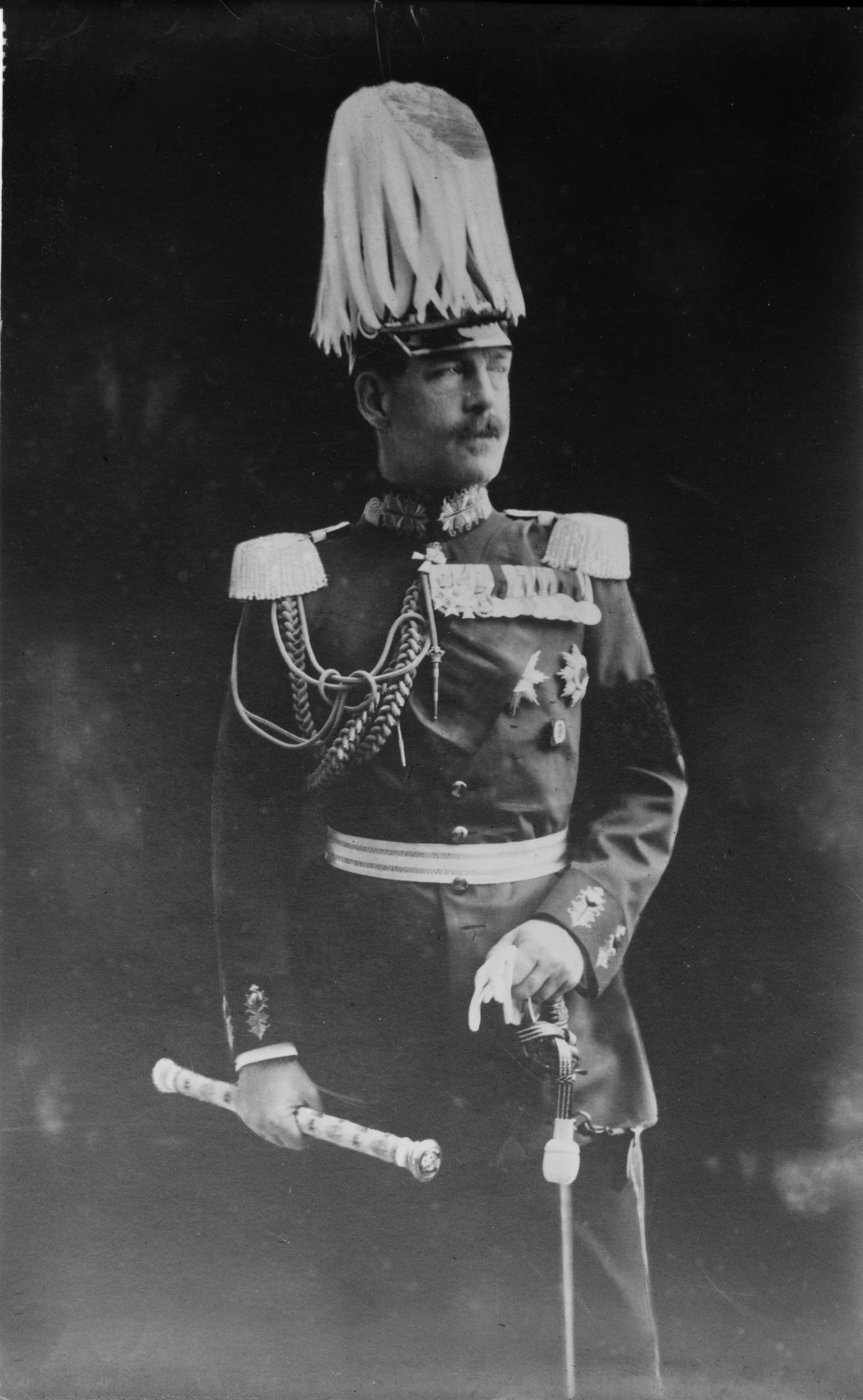
King Constantine I of Greece in the uniform of a German Field Marshal, a rank awarded to him by Wilhelm II, German Emperor in 1913.

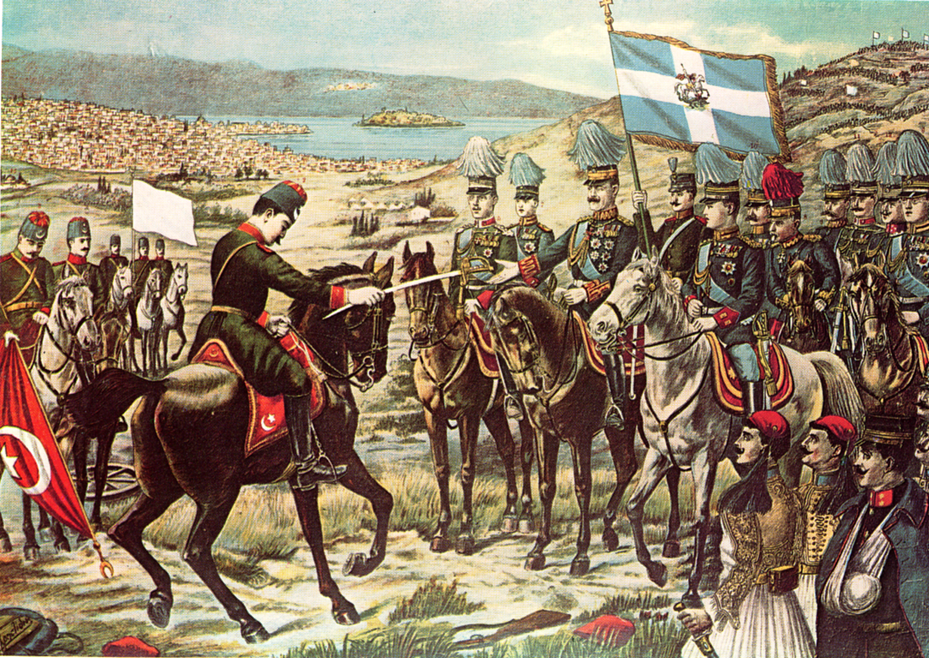
Greek lithography showing the surrender of Ioannina by Essat Pasha to Constantine I during the First Balkan War

In the meantime, operations in the Epirus front had stalled: against the rough terrain and Ottoman fortifications at Bizani, the small Greek force could not make any headway. With operations in Macedonia complete, Constantine transferred the bulk of his forces to Epirus, and assumed command. After lengthy preparations, the Greeks broke through the Ottoman defences in the Battle of Bizani and captured Ioannina and most of Epirus up into what is today southern Albania (Northern Epirus). These victories dispelled the tarnish of the 1897 defeat, and raised Constantine to great popularity with the Greek people.

=== Accession to the Throne and Second Balkan War ===
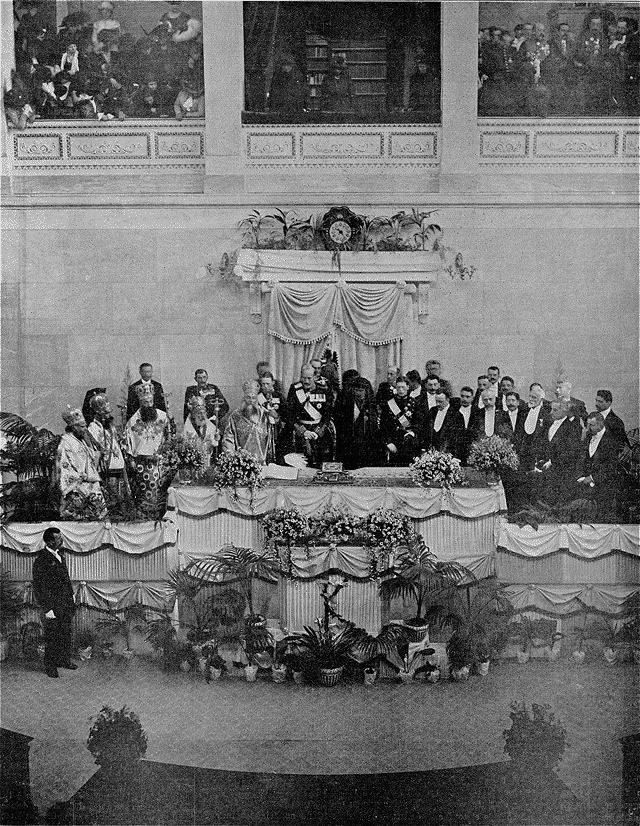
Swearing-in ceremony of Constantine, 1913

George I was assassinated in Thessaloniki by an anarchist, Alexandros Schinas, on 18 March 1913, and Constantine succeeded to the throne. In the meantime, tensions between the Balkan allies grew, as Bulgaria claimed Greek and Serbian-occupied territory. In May, Greece and Serbia concluded a secret defensive pact aimed at Bulgaria. On 16 June, the Bulgarian army attacked their erstwhile allies, but were soon halted. King Constantine led the Greek Army in its counterattack in the battles of Kilkis-Lahanas and the Kresna Gorge. In the meantime the Bulgarian army had started to disintegrate: beset by defeat in the hands of Greeks and Serbs, they were suddenly faced by a Turkish counterattack with fresh Asian troops finally ready, while the Romanians advanced south, demanding Southern Dobrudja. Under attack on four fronts Bulgaria sued for peace, agreed to an armistice and entered into negotiations in Bucharest. On the initiative of Prime Minister Venizelos, Constantine was also awarded the rank and baton of a Field Marshal. His popularity was at its peak. He was the "winner over the Bulgarians", the King who under his military commandment, doubled the Greek territory.

== World War I and the National Schism ==
=== Overview ===
The widely held view of Constantine I as a "German sympathizer" owes something to his marriage with Sophia of Prussia, sister of Wilhelm II, to his studies in Germany and his supposed "militaristic" beliefs and attitude.

Constantine did rebuff Kaiser Wilhelm who in 1914 pressed him to bring Greece into the war on the side of Austria-Hungary and Germany. In their correspondence he told him that his sympathy was with Germany, but he would not join the war. Constantine then offended also the British and French by blocking popular efforts by Prime Minister Venizelos to bring Greece into the war on the side of the Allies.

Constantine's insistence on neutrality, according to him and his supporters, was based more on his judgement that it was the best policy for Greece, rather than venal self-interest or his German dynastic connections, as he was accused of by the Venizelists.

Admiral Mark Kerr, who was Commander-in-Chief of the Royal Hellenic Navy in the early part of World War I and later Commander-in-Chief of the British Adriatic Squadron, supported the Allied cause, but was sympathetic to the King, personally. He wrote in 1920:

"The persecution of King Constantine by the press of the Allied countries, with some few good exceptions, has been one of the most tragic affairs since the Dreyfus case." [Abbott, G.F. (1922) 'Greece and the Allies 1914–1922']

Although Venizelos, with Allied support, forced Constantine to leave the throne in 1917, he remained popular with parts of the Greek people (as shown by the vote for his return in the December 1920 plebiscite), who saw the Allied actions as a violation of sovereignty of Greece.

=== Events ===
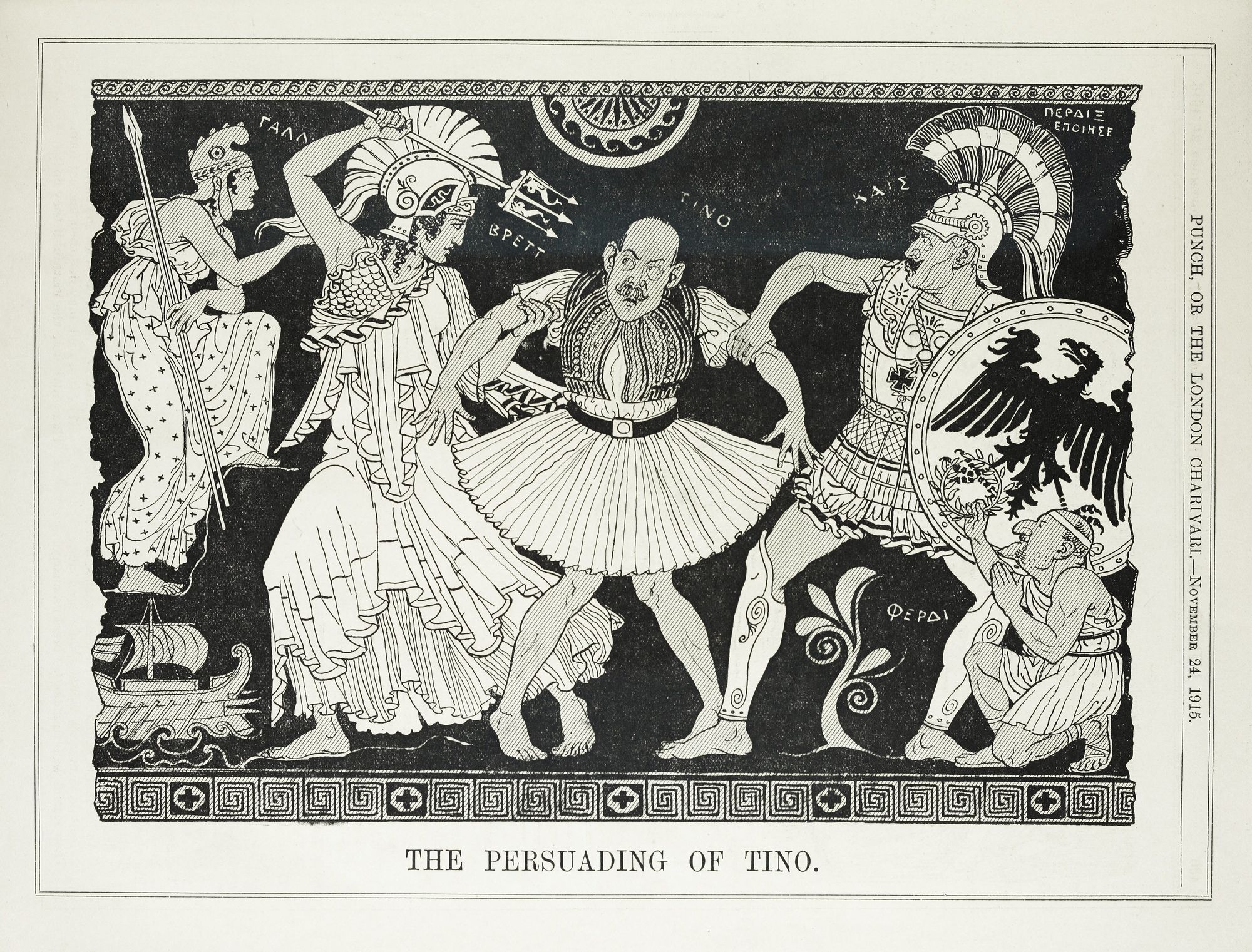
King Constantine ("Tino") being torn between Britain and France on the one, and Kaiser Wilhelm, assisted by Ferdinand of Bulgaria, on the other. Satirical cartoon in the style of an ancient Greek vase, published in Punch in November 1915

In the aftermath of the victorious Balkan Wars, Greece was in a state of euphoria. Her territory and population had doubled with the massive liberation of Greeks from Ottoman rule and, under the dual leadership of Constantine and Venizelos, her future seemed bright. However Constantine had been ill with pleurisy since the Balkan wars and almost died during the summer of 1915.

This state of affairs was not to last, however. When World War I broke out, a dispute appeared between the king and the government about the responsibility for the external policy of the state in case of war.

Constantine was faced with the difficulty of determining where Greece's support lay. His first concern as King was for the welfare and security of Greece. He rejected the early appeal from Kaiser Wilhelm that Greece should march on the side of Germany and stated that Greece would remain neutral. Sophie, Constantine's queen, was popularly thought to support her brother Kaiser Wilhelm, but it seems that she was actually pro-British; like her father the late Kaiser Frederick, Sophie was influenced by her mother, the British-born Victoria. Venizelos was fervently pro-Entente, having established excellent rapport with the British and French, and was convinced that German aggression had caused the war and that the Allies would quickly win the war.

Both Venizelos and Constantine were keenly aware that a maritime country like Greece could not, and should not, antagonise the Entente, the dominant naval powers in the Mediterranean. Constantine settled on a policy of neutrality because it seemed the path that best assured that Greece would emerge from the World War intact and with the substantial territorial gains it had won in the recent Balkan Wars.

In January 1915, the Entente made proposals to both Bulgaria and Greece to side with it. Bulgaria would take eastern Macedonia from Greece (with Drama and Kavala), while Greece in exchange would gain land in Asia Minor from Turkey after the war. Venizelos agreed but Constantine rejected the proposal.

Constantine claimed his military judgement was right, after the outcome of the Allies' failed operation of landing on Gallipoli. Despite the popularity of Venizelos and his clear majority in Parliament for supporting the Allies, Constantine opposed Venizelos. Venizelos actually wanted Greece to participate at the Gallipoli operation, but after military objections by the General Staff (Ioannis Metaxas), the King rejected the idea.

In autumn 1915, Bulgaria joined the Central Powers and attacked Serbia, with which Greece had a treaty of alliance. Venizelos again urged the King to allow Greece's entry into the war. The Hellenic army was mobilized for defensive reasons, but Constantine claimed that the treaty had no value in case of a global war, but only of Balkan issues. Furthermore, he supported that according to the treaty, Serbia should mobilize 150,000 soldiers against Bulgaria, something that it could not do at that time.

The British then offered Cyprus to the Greek Kingdom to join the war, but Constantine rejected this offer as well. Venizelos permitted Entente forces to disembark in Thessaloniki (establishing so the Macedonian front) in aid of Serbia and in preparation for a common campaign over the King's objections. This action of Venizelos, which violated the country's neutrality, enraged the King who dismissed him for second time.

At the same time, Germany offered the protection and security of the Greek population of Turkey during and after the war, in exchange for Greece to remain neutral. Constantine was accused also by his Venizelist opponents for secret discussions and correspondence with the Central Powers.

In March 1916, in an effort to increase his prestige, Constantine declared the official annexation of Northern Epirus, which was controlled by the Greeks since 1914, but the Greek forces were driven from the area by the Italians and French during the next year.

In June 1916, Constantine, General Metaxas (the future dictator) and Prime Minister Skouloudis allowed Fort Rupel and parts of eastern Macedonia to be occupied, without opposition, by the Germans and Bulgarians, as a counterbalance to the Allied forces in Thessaloniki. This caused popular anger, especially in Greek Macedonia which now was facing the Bulgarian danger. The leadership of the Allied armies in Thessaloniki was worried also about a possible attack by the army of Constantine in their back.

In July 1916, arsonists set fire to the forest surrounding the summer palace at Tatoi. Although injured in the escape, the king and his family managed to flee to safety. The flames spread quickly in the dry summer heat, and sixteen people were killed. Royal rumors connected the incident with actions by French agents, especially De Roquefeuil, who was in Athens since 1915, but it was never proven. A hunting of Venizelists followed in Athens.

In August 1916, a military coup broke out in Thessaloniki by Venizelist officers. There, Venizelos established a provisional revolutionary government, which created its own army and declared war on the Central Powers. With Allied support, the revolutionary government of Venizelos gained control of half the country – significantly, most of the "New Lands" won during the Balkan Wars. This cemented the National Schism, a division of Greek society between Venizelists and anti-Venizelist monarchists, which was to have repercussions in Greek politics until past World War II. Venizelos made a public call to the King to dismiss his "bad advisors", to join the war as King of all Greeks and stop being a politician. The royal governments of Constantine in Athens continued to negotiate with the Allies a possible entry in the war.

During November/December 1916, the British and French landed units at Athens claiming the surrender of war materiel equivalent to what was lost at Fort Rupel as a guarantee of Greece's neutrality. After days of tension, finally they met resistance by paramilitary (Epistratoi) and pro-royalist forces (during the Noemvriana events), that were commanded by officers Metaxas and Dousmanis. After an armed confrontation, the Allies evacuated the capital and recognized officially the government of Venizelos in Thessaloniki. Constantine so became the most hated person for the Allies after his best man Kaiser Wilhelm.

Early in 1917, the Venizelist Government of National Defence (based in Thessaloniki) took control of Thessaly.

After the fall of the monarchy in Russia, Constantine lost his last supporter inside the Entente opposed to his removal from the throne. In the face of Venizelist and Anglo-French pressure, King Constantine finally left the country for Switzerland on 11 June 1917; his second-born son Alexander became king in his place. The Allied Powers were opposed to Constantine's first born son George becoming king, as he had served in the German army before the war and like his father was thought to be a Germanophile.

== Restoration and Asia Minor Catastrophe ==
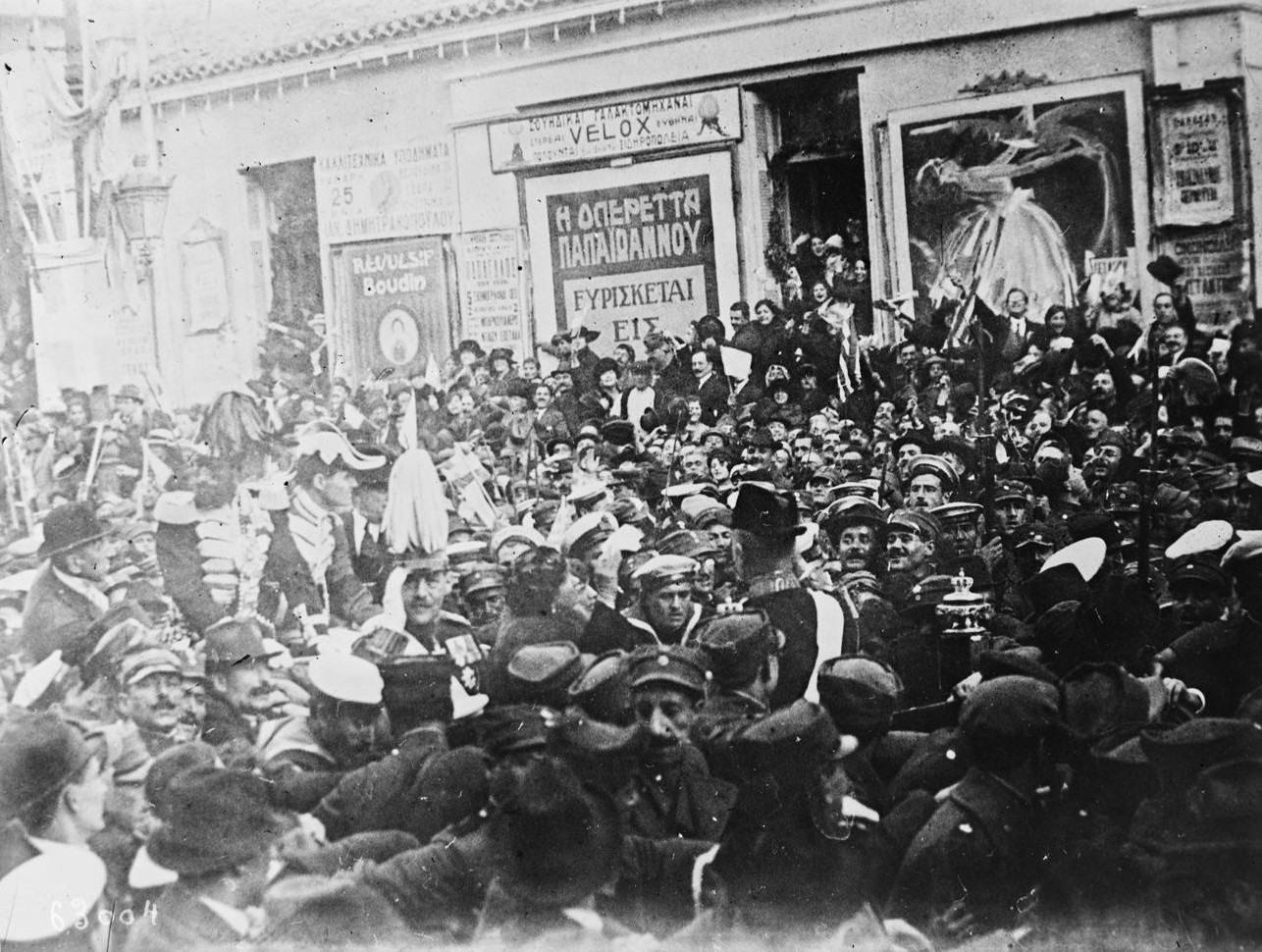
Return of Constantine, December 1920

King Alexander died on 25 October 1920, after a freak accident: he was strolling with his dogs in the royal menagerie, when they attacked a monkey. Rushing to save the poor animal, the king was bitten by the monkey. What seemed like a minor injury turned to sepsis, and he died a few days later. The following month Venizelos suffered a surprising defeat in a general election.

Greece had at this point been at war for eight continuous years: World War I had come and gone, but yet no sign of an enduring peace was near, as the country was already at war against the Kemalist forces in Asia Minor. Young men had been fighting and dying for years, lands lay fallow for lack of hands to cultivate them, and the country, morally exhausted, was at the brink of economic and political unravelling.

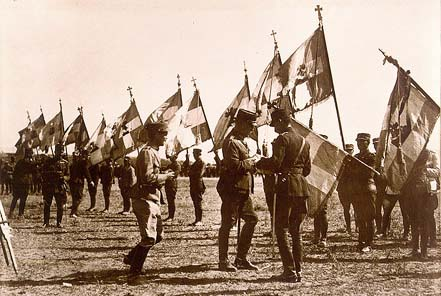
Constantine decorating regimental war flags of the Greek Army after the Battle of Kütahya-Eskişehir, during the Greco-Turkish War (1919–1922).

The pro-royalist parties had promised peace and prosperity under the victorious Field Marshal of the Balkan Wars, he who knew of the soldier's plight because he had fought next to him and shared his ration.

Following a plebiscite in which nearly 99% of votes were cast in favor of his return, Constantine returned as king on 19 December 1920. This caused great dissatisfaction not only to the newly liberated populations in Asia Minor, but also to the British and even more the French, who opposed the return of Constantine.

The new government decided to continue the war. The inherited, ongoing campaign began with initial successes in western Anatolia against the Turks. The Greeks initially met with disorganized opposition.

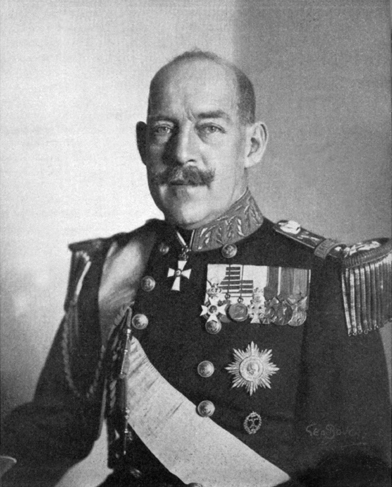
Constantine I in 1921

In March 1921, despite his health problems, Constantine was landed in Anatolia to boost the Army's morale and command personally the Battle of Kütahya-Eskişehir.

However, an ill-conceived plan to capture Kemal's new capital of Ankara, located deep in barren Anatolia, where there was no significant Greek population, succeeded only in its initial stages. The overextended and ill-supplied Greek Army was routed and driven from Anatolia back to the coast in August 1922. Following an army revolt by Venizelist officers, considering him as key responsible for the defeat, Constantine abdicated the throne again on 27 September 1922 and was succeeded by his eldest son, George II.

== Second exile and death ==
He spent the last four months of his life in exile in Italy and died at 1:30 am on 11 January 1923 at Palermo, Sicily of heart failure. His wife, Sophie of Prussia, was never allowed back to Greece and was later interred beside her husband in the Russian Church in Florence.

After his restoration on the Greek throne, George II organized the repatriation of the remains of members of his family who died in exile; an important religious ceremony that brought together, for six days in November 1936, all members of the royal family still alive. Constantine's body was buried at the royal burial ground at Tatoi Palace, where he remains.

== Marriage and issue ==
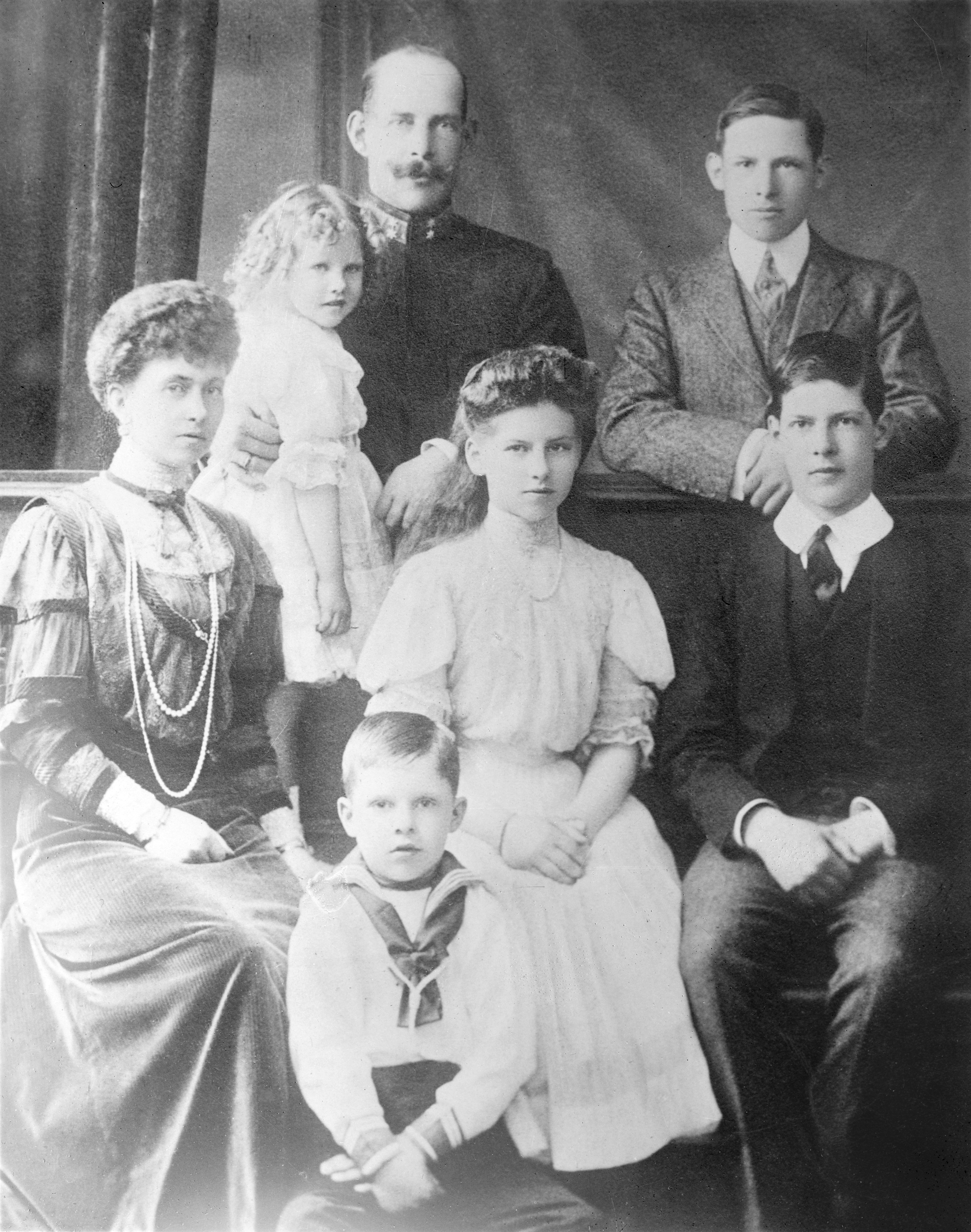
Constantine with his family, ca. 1910. Top left: the king holding the toddler Princess Irene. Top right: the future George II. Left: Queen Sophia. Center: Princess Helen. Right: the future Alexander I. Front: the future Paul I. Princess Katherine not yet born.

As Crown Prince of Greece, Constantine married Princess Sophia of Prussia, a granddaughter of Queen Victoria and sister of Kaiser Wilhelm II, on 27 October 1889 in Athens. They had six children. All three of their sons ascended the Greek throne. Their eldest daughter Helen married Crown Prince Carol of Romania; their second daughter married the 4th Duke of Aosta; while their youngest child, Princess Katherine, married a British commoner.

Name	Birth	Death	Notes
King George II	20 July 1890	1 April 1947	married Princess Elisabeth of Romania
King Alexander	1 August 1893	25 October 1920	married Aspasia Manos aka Princess Alexander of Greece; father of Queen Alexandra of Yugoslavia
Princess Helen	2 May 1896	28 November 1982	married Crown Prince Carol of Romania, later King of Romania; mother of King Michael I of Romania
King Paul	14 December 1901	6 March 1964	married Princess Frederica of Hanover; father of King Constantine II of Greece and Queen Sofía of Spain (herself the mother of King Felipe VI of Spain)
Princess Irene	13 February 1904	15 April 1974	married Prince Aimone, Duke of Aosta, nominally King Tomislav II of Croatia from 1941 to 1943
Princess Katharine	4 May 1913	2 October 2007	married Major Richard Brandram MC

== Legacy and popular culture ==
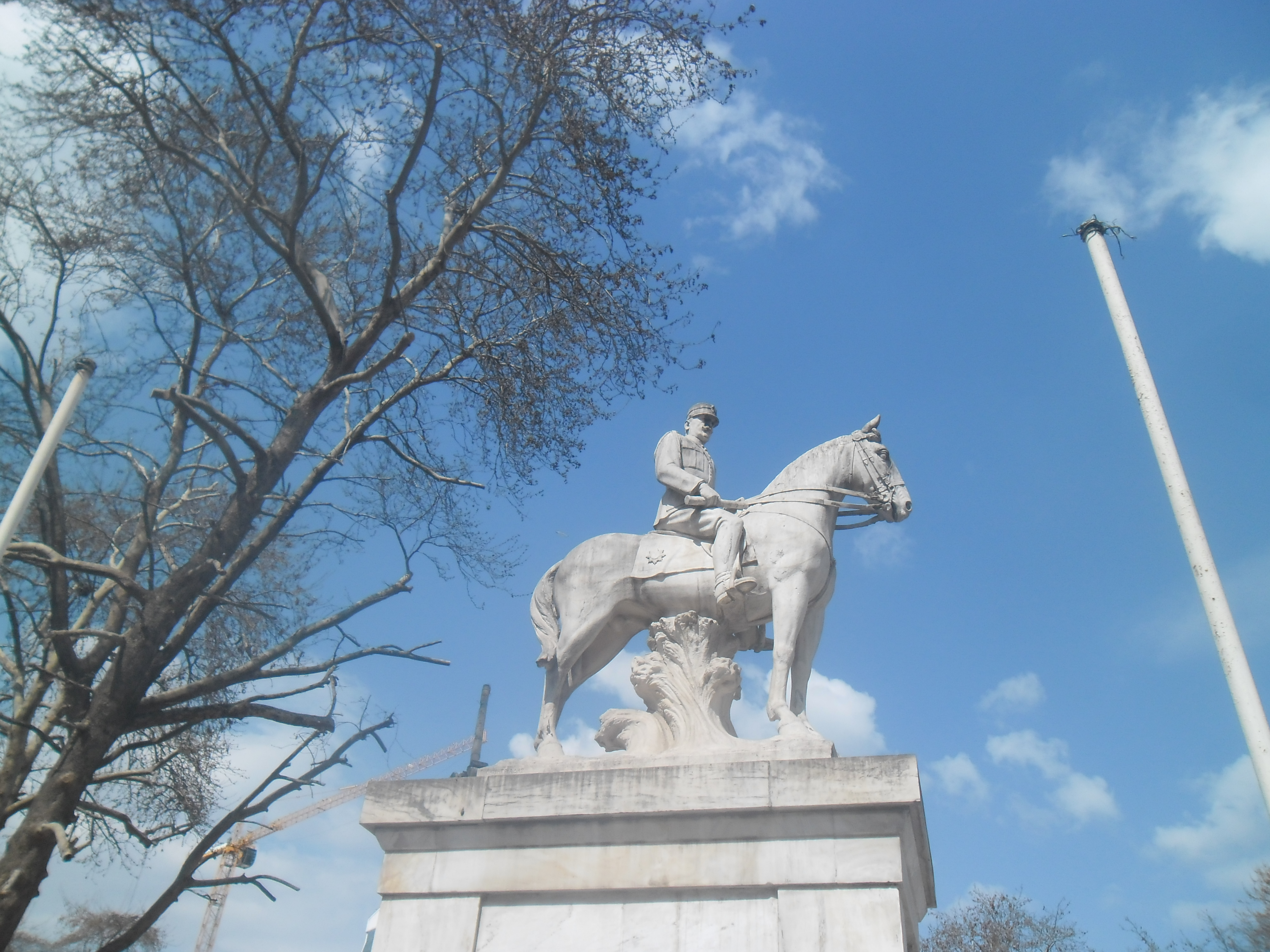
A statue in Thessaloniki

Constantine remained an idol for his supporters (much like Venizelos for his own supporters), and generally for the conservative Right, for years after his death. However, nowadays the legacy of Venizelos is more appreciated.

In the popular culture, the slogan of the royalists "psomí, elia ke Kotso Vasiliá" ("bread, olives and King Constantine") still survives. It was a popular phrase during the naval blockade of southern Greece by the Allied fleet (1916/17), which caused hunger to the population.

== Titles, styles, honours and arms ==
=== Titles and styles ===
From birth, Constantine was styled "His Royal Highness The Crown Prince (Diadochos) of Greece" until his accession to the throne. On the day of his baptism, his father issued a royal decree granting him the additional title of Duke of Sparta; however, this title was used only outside of Greece.

He is sometimes numbered Constantine XII in succession to Constantine XI Palaiologos. During and after the Second Balkan War, he earned the nickname "The Bulgar-Slayer" (Greek: Βουλγαροκτόνος), just like Basil II Porphyrogenitus.

"The greatest of the Constantines, the Bulgarslayer, [Constantine] XII". In this 1913 Greek poster, Constantine is titled after both Basil II and Constantine XI.

=== Honours ===
- Kingdom of Greece:
  - Grand Cross of the Redeemer
  - Commander's Cross of the Cross of Valour, October 1914
  - Founder of the Order of George I, 16 January 1915
- Denmark:
  - Knight of the Elephant, 28 August 1886
  - Cross of Honour of the Order of the Dannebrog, 26 September 1888
  - Grand Commander of the Dannebrog, 28 March 1913; in Diamonds, 11 January 1923
  - Commemorative Medal for the Golden Wedding of King Christian IX and Queen Louise
  - King Christian IX Centenary Medal
- (Austrian Empire) (Kingdom of Hungary) Austria-Hungary: Grand Cross of the Royal Hungarian Order of St. Stephen, 1886
- Kingdom of Bulgaria: Grand Cross of St. Alexander, with Collar, 1912
- France: Grand Cross of the Legion of Honour, 13 December 1886
- Kingdom of Italy: Knight of the Annunciation, 27 October 1889
- Kingdom of Romania: Grand Cross of the Order of Carol I, with Collar, 1913
- Russian Empire: Knight of St. Andrew, June 1887
- Spain:
  - Grand Cross of the Order of Charles III, 22 December 1886
  - Knight of the Golden Fleece, 17 October 1889
- Sweden-Norway: Knight of the Seraphim, 23 September 1886
- United Kingdom:
  - Honorary Grand Cross of the Bath (civil), 4 July 1895
  - Recipient of the Royal Victorian Chain, 9 August 1902
- Kingdom of Prussia: Knight of the Black Eagle 23.12.1887
- Anhalt: Grand Cross of the Order of Albert the Bear, 1888
- Baden:
  - Knight of the House Order of Fidelity, 1888
  - Knight of the Order of Berthold the First, 1888
- Brunswick: Grand Cross of the Order of Henry the Lion, 1888
- Hesse and by Rhine: Grand Cross of the Ludwig Order, 7 October 1903
- Saxe-Weimar-Eisenach: Grand Cross of the White Falcon, 1888
- Saxony: Knight of the Rue Crown, 1888
- Württemberg: Grand Cross of the Württemberg Crown, 1889

== Ancestry ==
Ancestors of Constantine I of Greece

8. Friedrich Wilhelm, Duke of Schleswig-Holstein-Sonderburg-Glücksburg
4. Christian IX, King of Denmark
9. Princess Louise Caroline of Hesse-Kassel
2. George I, King of the Hellenes
10. Prince William of Hesse-Kassel
5. Princess Louise of Hesse-Kassel
11. Princess Charlotte of Denmark
1. Constantine I, King of the Hellenes
12. Nicholas I, Emperor of Russia
6. Grand Duke Konstantin Nikolayevich of Russia
13. Princess Charlotte of Prussia
3. Grand Duchess Olga Constantinovna of Russia
14. Joseph, Duke of Saxe-Altenburg
7. Princess Alexandra of Saxe-Altenburg
15. Duchess Amelia of Württemberg

== Notes ==
Constantine I of Greece House of Glücksburg Cadet branch of the House of Oldenburg Born: 2 August 1868 Died: 11 January 1923
Regnal titles
Preceded by George I	King of the Hellenes; 18 March 1913 – 11 June 1917	Succeeded by Alexander I
Preceded by Alexander I	King of the Hellenes; 19 December 1920 – 27 September 1922	Succeeded by George II
Greek royalty
Vacant Title last held by Luitpold Karl	Crown Prince of Greece; 12 August 1868 – 18 March 1913	Succeeded by George of Greece
Civic offices
First	President of the Organizing Committee for Summer Olympic Games; 1896	Succeeded by Pierre de Coubertin
