= Dominique-Marie Gauchet =

French admiral

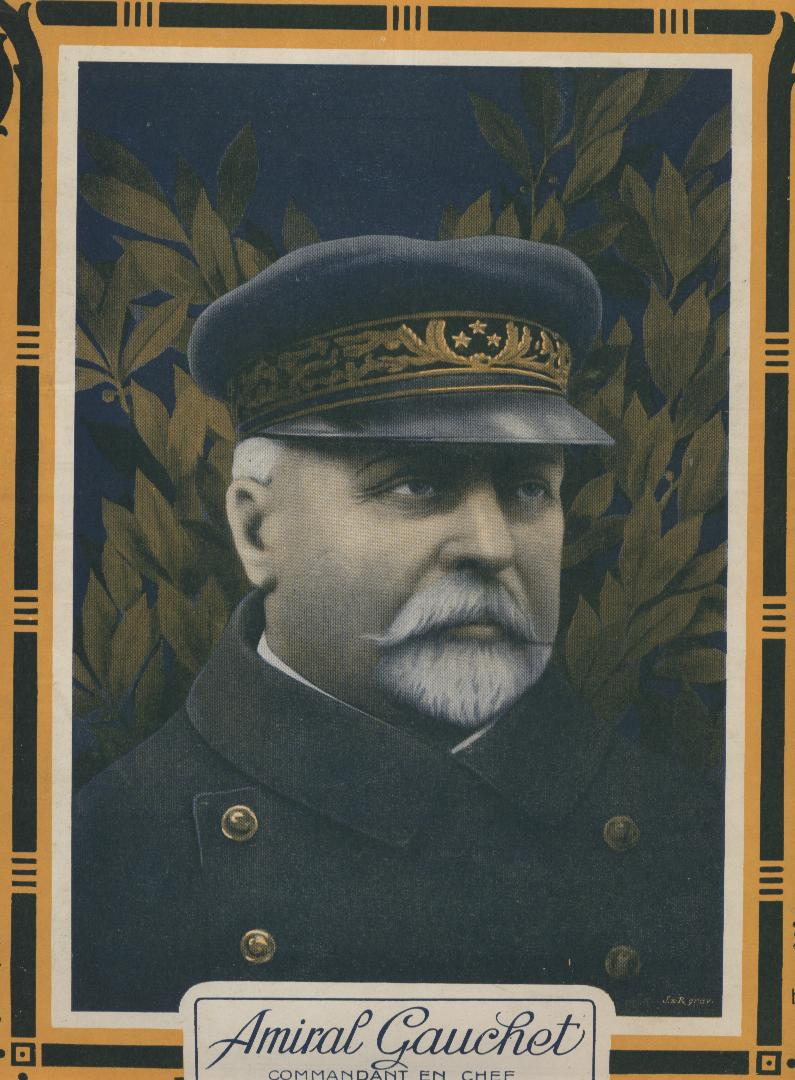
- Born: 14 August 1853; Vains, France
- Died: 4 February 1931 (aged 77); Vains, France
- Resting place: Les Invalides, Paris
- Occupation: French Navy
- Years active: 1917–1919 (Admiral)
- Known for: Admiral in World War I

Dominique-Marie Gauchet (14 August 1853 in Vains – 4 February 1931 in Vains) was a French admiral during World War I.

== Life ==
After a career of almost 40 years in the French Navy, Gauchet was appointed commander of the French Dardanelles squadron at the time of the Gallipoli Campaign. In March 1916 he led the first squadron. In December 1916, he replaced Louis Dartige du Fournet as Allied commander in the Mediterranean Sea and continued in that role until the end of the war.

He organized the convoy system against submarine attacks and the blockade of the Austro-Hungarian fleet in the Adriatic from Corfu. In June 1917 he led the occupation of the Corinth Canal and in March 1918 the blockade of the Soviet Black Sea fleet by patrolling the Aegean Sea.

He retired in August 1919 and died in February 1931. He is buried in Les Invalides in Paris.
