= Saint-Chamassy =

- Commune
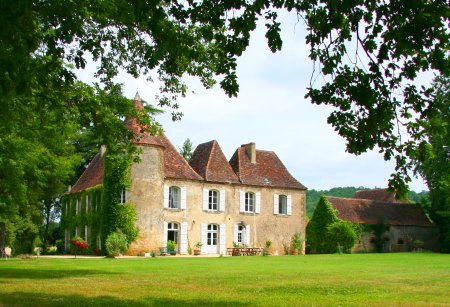
- Chateau of Falgueyrac

- Coat of arms
- Location of Saint-Chamassy
- Location within France Location within Nouvelle-Aquitaine
- Coordinates: 44°52′25″N 0°55′42″E
- Country: France
- Region: Nouvelle-Aquitaine
- Department: Dordogne
- Arrondissement: Sarlat-la-Canéda
- Canton: Vallée de l'Homme
- Intercommunality: Vallée de l'Homme

Government
  - Mayor (2020–2026): Roland Delmas
- Area^{1}: 15.6 km^{2} (6.0 sq mi)
- Elevation: 175 m (574 ft)
- Highest elevation: 220 m (720 ft)
- Lowest elevation: 45 m (148 ft)
- Population (2023): 512
  - Density: 32.8/km^{2} (85.0/sq mi)
- Time zone: UTC+01:00 (CET)
  - Summer (DST): UTC+02:00 (CEST)
- INSEE/Postal code: 24388 /24260
- ^{1} French Land Register data, which excludes lakes, ponds, glaciers > 1 km^{2} (0.386 sq mi or 247 acres) and river estuaries.

Saint-Chamassy (French pronunciation: [sɛ̃ ʃamasi]; Occitan: Sench Amaci) is a commune in the Dordogne department in Nouvelle-Aquitaine in southwestern France.

== Population ==
Historical population
Year	Pop.	±% p.a.
1968	414	—
1975	380	−1.22%
1982	385	+0.19%
1990	433	+1.48%
1999	443	+0.25%
2007	492	+1.32%
2012	533	+1.61%
2017	514	−0.72%
2023	512	−0.06%
Source: INSEE

== See also ==
- Communes of the Dordogne department
