= Páll =

Páll is a name of Old Norse origin. Nowadays, it is primarily used in Icelandic [ˈpʰautl̥] and Faroese names. Notable people with the name include:

- Páll Bálkason (died 1231), Hebridean lord who was an ally of Olaf the Black
- Páll Gíslason (1924–2004), Icelandic medical practitioner and scout
- Páll Guðlaugsson (born 1958), Icelandic football player and coach
- Páll Guðmundsson (born 1959), Icelandic sculptor and artist
- Páll Mohr Joensen (born 1986), Faroese footballer
- Nólsoyar Páll (1766–c.1808), Faroese national hero
- Jóhann Páll Jóhannsson (born 1992), Icelandic politician
- Páll Jónsson (1155–1211), Icelandic Roman Catholic clergyman
- Sigurður Páll Jónsson (born 1958), Icelandic politician
- Páll Klettskarð (born 1990), Faroese football striker
- Páll Magnússon (born 1954), Icelandic television director
- Páll Melsteð (disambiguation), multiple people, including:
  - Páll Melsteð (amtmann) (1791–1861), Icelandic official and politician
  - Páll Melsteð (historian) (1812–1910), Icelandic historian
- Páll Ólafsson (disambiguation), multiple people, including:
  - Páll Ólafsson (handballer) (born 1960), Icelandic Olympic handballer
  - Páll Ólafsson (poet) (1827–1905), Icelandic poet
- Páll Bragi Pétursson (born 1937), Icelandic politician
- Páll á Reynatúgvu (born 1967), Faroese politician and footballer
- Páll Ragnar Pálsson (born 1977), Icelandic composer and member of Icelandic rock band Maus
- Páll Skúlason (1945–2015), Icelandic professor of philosophy and Rector of the University of Iceland

== Surname ==
- Sándor Páll (1954–2010), ethnic Hungarian politician in Serbia

== See also ==
- Pall (name)
- Paul (name)
