= Pall =

Pall may refer to:

- Pall (funeral), a cloth used to cover a coffin
- Pall (heraldry), a Y-shaped heraldic charge
- Pall (liturgy), a piece of stiffened linen used to cover the chalice at the Eucharist
- Pall Corporation, a global business
- Pall., author abbreviation of German naturalist Peter Simon Pallas
- Pallium, a vestment pertaining to an archbishop
- Pall (name)
- Páll, name

== See also ==
- Pail (disambiguation)
- Pale (disambiguation)
- Pall Mall (disambiguation)
- PAL (disambiguation)
