= 1921 in Greece =

Coordinates: 39°27′19″N 22°28′11″E

- Decades: 1900s; 1910s; 1920s; 1930s; 1940s
- See also: Other events of 1921; List of years in Greece

At the end of 1920, the death of King Alexander, the fall of Eleftherios Venizelos, and the return of King Constantine I to the throne brought Greece once more to the fore in international politics. Although "unrecognized" by the great Allied Powers, King Constantine I resumed his interrupted reign amidst frantic acclamations of the population, a wave of anti-Venizelist reprisals, and dark war clouds in Anatolia where the Turkish Nationalist leader, Mustafa Kemal Pasha, was daily increasing his following.

== Incumbents ==
- Monarch: Constantine I
- Prime Minister:
  - until 6 February: Dimitrios Rallis
  - 6 February–8 April: Nikolaos Kalogeropoulos
  - starting 8 April: Dimitrios Gounaris

== Opening of the Chamber of Deputies ==
On January 4, 1921, King Constantine inaugurated his reinstatement in his constitutional rights and duties by opening the newly elected Chamber of Deputies. In his speech from the throne the king expressed his intention of continuing the campaign in Asia Minor, and declared the Chamber to be a National Assembly. One of the features of the opening ceremony was the absence of all Liberal or Venizelist members. The anti-Venizelist campaign, in spite of all statements to the contrary, did not appear to have died down. On January 5, Athens was the scene of another wanton act of political vendetta - the murder of Colonel Fatseas, a prominent Venizelist officer.

== Resumption of war ==
The intention declared in the royal speech at the opening of the Chamber of resuming the war against Kemal was supported by an official report issued on January 10 of a renewal of the Greek offensive to the northeast of Smyrna and in the Brussa area, and the same day the Greeks occupied Belejik. On the following day the Greek Liberal organ Patris published a letter from Nice, where Venizelos was residing at the time, confirming the Greek statesman's final decision to retire from politics. This decision was naturally not displeasing to the supporters of King Constantine, who a little later found another cause for jubilation when the king of Italy received the newly appointed Greek minister to Rome (January 13). Thus Italy was the first among foreign Allied and neutral powers to recognize King Constantine. But the enthusiasm was soon damped by the joint representations made on the 20th to the Greek government by the British and French ministers in Athens on the transformation of the Chamber into a National Assembly. This action by the two Allied governments was declared to be based on the rights of the powers in question as guarantors of the constitution of Greece, rights which they considered as still existent, since the Treaty of Sèvres, in which they were surrendered, had not yet been ratified by all the signatories. Early in February the Allied Supreme Council invited the Greek and Turkish governments to attend a conference to be held in the latter part of the month in London with the object of bringing about peace between the two countries. The invitation was coldly received in Athens, and was the cause of a split in the Dimitrios Rallis cabinet on the score of wounded personal vanities. Dimitrios Gounaris, minister of war, the real leader of the Constantino faction, who, in deference to Allied public opinion, which had stigmatized him as a pro-German, had after the defeat of the Venizelists been compelled to renounce his claims to the premiership in favor of the less compromised Rallis, after being also refused the presidency of the Greek delegation to the London conference, resigned, bringing about a ministerial crisis.

== New government ==
The Rallis cabinet was succeeded by a new government with Nikolaos Kalogeropoulos, of no outstanding political ability, but having the reputation of an Entente-phile, as premier and minister of foreign affairs, Gounaris resuming his post as minister of war, Petros Protopapadakis - finance and supplies, Th. Zaimis - education, Petros Mavromichalis - agriculture and national economy, Tsaldaris - interior and communications, Theotokis - justice, Rallis Jr. - marine. Apparently Gounaris continued to press his claims to be chief Greek delegate at the London conference, but according to the Greek press, "on learning the unfavorable impression created in London by the reports of his intention to represent Greece", he agreed to the nomination of Kalogeropoulos. Meanwhile, the promises held out to the Greek masses by the Constantinists in the course of their electoral campaign, for the early cessation of hostilities and of mobilizations, the reduction of taxation, and the regulation of the labor question on lines proposed by the Socialist Party, which supported the anti-Venizelist campaign, not having been redeemed, internal unrest among the urban proletariat began to manifest itself in a series of industrial strikes (gas, electric light, tramway and electric railway workers) in Athens, and threatened to develop into a general stoppage of work all over the country (February 12). The Liberal Party which had up until then held itself aloof from politics decided, as the fate of Greece and of her new territorial acquisitions were in the balance in London, to renounce its attitude of passive opposition, and in all matters of national importance which possessed an international aspect, to join the "united national front". This, together with certain declarations made by Venizelos to the foreign press in which he declared his wholehearted support of the national aspirations, gave birth to rumors regarding a rapprochement between the ex-premier and King Constantine. But the rumors were short-lived, for Venizelos, on February 16, denied their truth.

== London conference ==
On February 18 the Greek delegation, headed by the premier Kalogeropoulos, and including a number of economic and military experts, arrived in London. The conference opened on the 21st, and the Supreme Council heard the Greek delegation. The Greek premier declared that Greece was prepared and willing to clear Anatolia of the Turkish Nationalists.

After also hearing Turkish delegations both from Constantinople and Angora, the Supreme Council proposed the dispatch of an international commission of inquiry to study on the spot the general situation in Smyrna and Thrace. Kalogeropoulos referred this proposal to Athens, where it was rejected by the National Assembly. As Kalogeropoulos appeared not to be invested with full powers to bind his self on behalf of the Greek government, the Supreme Council demanded the dispatch to London of a new Greek plenipotentiary. After protracted negotiations as to his being accepted as persona grata by the Allies, Gounaris arrived in London on March 9. Three days later the Supreme Council formulated proposals for the solution of the Greco-Turkish difficulty and for a modification of the Sèvres Treaty. It was proposed that the demilitarized zone of the Straits should be reduced to the following lines: on the European side - Gallipoli peninsula and the coast along the Sea of Marmora as far as Rodosto; on the Asiatic side - from a point opposite the isle of Tenedos to Kara-Bigha (west of Panderma), including the islands in the Sea of Marmora and the European and Asiatic shores of the Bosporus; the expression "demilitarized" zone was to mean that whereas the Allies might send troops to this zone, both Greece and Turkey should be deprived of this right; the east coast of the Sea of Marmora was excluded from the demilitarized zone; the Allied troops occupying Constantinople were to be withdrawn, after the Allies had satisfied themselves of the bona-fide peaceful intentions of the Turks; Turkey was to have an equal voice on the international committee established to control the Straits, receiving two votes instead of one; and if Turkey's attitude on the whole proved satisfactory, she would, in all probability, be offered the honorary presidency of the commission. Turkey was also to receive a place on a voting basis instead of in an advisory capacity on the financial commission; Thrace was not to be internationalized, and as for the Smyrna area it was considered desirable to leave the Greek and Turkish inhabitants in their own districts; the sovereignty of the sultan over the vilayet of Smyrna was to be restored, the city of Smyrna to be occupied by Greek troops, but elsewhere in the vilayet order should be maintained by local gendarmes under Allied officers; a Christian governor should be appointed, chosen by the League of Nations; a revision of this status to be granted after five years if applied for to the League of Nations; Turkey should be included in the League of Nations if she consents to ratify a modification of the Sèvres Treaty on the above lines.

== After London ==
The Greek and Turkish delegations on receiving these proposals from the Supreme Council left London to submit them to their respective governments. Simultaneously with the departure of the Greek delegation from London a royal decree called up the 1913, 1914, and 1915 classes of Greek reservists, and King Constantine issued a proclamation declaring Greece's intention to continue the war against the Kemalists in order to ensure the pacification of the Orient. On March 23 a New Greek offensive was launched in Asia Minor. The Hellenic troops advancing in two separate lines in the neighborhood of Ushak and Brussa, compelled the Turkish forces to retreat. The Greek offensive continued successfully, and on March 27 and 28 the Greeks occupied two important strategical points, Afium-Karahissar and Eskişehir.

On April 1 Gounaris, emboldened by the fact of his being "officially" recognized by the Allies in London, at last assumed the premiership on the resignation of Kalogeropoulos, who received the portfolio of finance. Some time previously Kalogeropoulos had ceded the portfolio of foreign affairs to Georgios Valtatzis, who remained foreign minister under Gounaris. Immediately upon the reconstruction of the cabinet King Constantine left for the front accompanied by the prince Andrew and prince Nicholas. A further mobilization of officers of the 1910-13 classes was ordered. The Turks showed stubborn resistance to the east of Eskishehr, and on April 4 it was reported that the Greeks had suffered a severe check. By this time the renewed outbreak of hostilities on a large scale in Anatolia convinced the Allies that no replies to the proposals of the Supreme Council were to be expected from the Greek and Turkish governments.

== Internal situation ==
The internal situation in Greece, notwithstanding all official assurances to the contrary, continued to be serious, particularly in Macedonia, Salonica, and Crete, and consequently on April 12 martial law was proclaimed and a censorship of the press reintroduced. During the month of May the military situation in Anatolia remained indefinite, the Greeks suspending their offensive in order to prepare for a renewal of operations on a larger scale. On May 18 the Allied high commissioners issued a proclamation regarding the neutrality of Constantinople and the Straits. By the beginning of June the preparations for the new Greek offensive were near completion, and on the 11th King Constantine once more left for Smyrna accompanied by the Diadoch, Prince Nicholas and Prince Andrew, the premier, Gounaris, the minister of war, Theotokis, and General Dousmanis, chief of the general staff. On June 20 the Allies despatched a note to Greece renewing their offer of intervention between the two warring parties. The Greek government, after having submitted its decision to King Constantine in Smyrna for approval, replied by a note dated June 25 in which it in effect refused the proffered negotiations. Preparations for the new offensive were continued. The Greeks in the meantime evacuated Ismidt, thus considerably weakening the defensive of the Kemalists. In the early part of July the Greeks made some progress in their offensive, occupying Nicaea and advancing from Brussa to Yenisher, reoccupying by July 15 Afium Karahissar, evacuated in the spring retreat, and three days later Kutahia, an important key position. The battle of Kutahia ended in a rout of the Kemalist forces with a great haul of booty and prisoners for the Greeks, the fall of Eskishehr, and the general retreat of the Turks.

== Renewal of offensive ==
About the middle of August the Greeks renewed the offensive in the direction of Angora and Koniah. The Greek troops crossed the river Sakaria where they met with strong resistance from the Turks, and by the middle of September the Turks were able to check the Greek onslaught. On September 4 it was officially announced that owing to ill-health King Constantine was obliged to move from Eskishehr to Brussa. This was the first veiled intimation of a reverse suffered by the Greek forces, and it was followed, five days later, by the further announcement that the general staff had decided for the time being "to suspend the efforts of the Greek armies", a decision which was followed by the complete withdrawal of Greek troops to the west of the Sakaria river. A statement to the effect that the Greek government had requested Lord Robert Cecil to invite the mediation of the League of Nations between Greece and Turkey was officially repudiated, but at the same time Greek government circles did not deny that Greece had informed Britain of the conditions on which she was prepared to make peace with Angora (September 20). Gounaris actually contemplated visiting London in connection with the possibility of Britain consenting to act as mediator.

== The National Assembly ==
On October 3 Nikolaos Stratos, one of the chiefs of the opposition and leader of the National Reformist Party, had an audience of the king, and demanded the convocation of the National Assembly so that the latter should take a responsible decision regarding the general political situation and the desirability of requesting foreign mediation in the Turkish-Greek conflict. The National Assembly was hurriedly convened on October 16, and after hearing a statement by the premier, granted Gounaris a vote of confidence and endorsed his decision to visit London and Paris. After meeting with a cold reception in Paris, Gounaris and Valtatzis (the foreign minister) arrived in London on October 27 and saw the Marquess Curzon at the British Foreign Office. At the suggestion of the British foreign secretary a meeting of the foreign ministers of Great Britain, France, and Italy to be held at a future date was proposed to discuss the Near Eastern questions. As Gounaris' mission to London had failed to bring about any definite results the Greek premier and foreign minister left London for Rome, where lately a less hostile attitude to Greece had been noticeable.

In the meantime internal party strife continued in Greece, and great excitement was caused in Athens by the election in Constantinople in December as Ecumenical Patriarch of Mgr. Meletios Metaxakis, the ex-archbishop of Athens, deposed in 1920 in consequence of his Venizelist sympathies. On December 21 an attempt was made in Athens to assassinate Admiral Pavlos Kountouriotis, the ex-regent and prominent Venizelist.

== End of the year ==
The year 1921 closed for Greece with the same indefinite conditions as at its opening. The war waged for over two years in Asia Minor was as far from a conclusion as ever; and the internal political and economic situation was once more critical. It is intelligible, therefore, that rumors of King Constantine's second (this time voluntary) abdication should have found currency in Greece.
