= PAL (disambiguation) =

PAL, or Phase Alternating Line, is a colour encoding system for analogue television.

PAL, Pal, or pal may also refer to:

== Arts and entertainment ==
- Pal (album), a 1999 studio album by Indian singer KK
- Pal (dog), the first dog to play Lassie in film and television
- Pal the Wonder Dog, of Buster Brown and Our Gang early movie fame
- Parental Advisory label, a warning label used on music with profanity
- Pal, a character in the animated TV series Arthur
- PAL, the main antagonist in The Mitchells vs. the Machines

== Businesses and organizations ==
- Pal's, an American fast food chain
- Pakistan Academy of Letters, a learned academy in Pakistan
- Parents Action League, an anti-gay organization
- Police Athletic League, an American youth sports league
- Police Athletic League of New York City, a youth organization in New York City
- Polish Academy of Literature (Polska Akademia Literatury)

== Languages ==
- Pal language, spoken in Papua New Guinea
- Middle Persian language, formerly spoken in Iran (ISO 639-2 & ISO 639-3 codes: pal)

== People ==
- Pal (given name), a list of people with the given name
- Pál, a list of people with the Hungarian given name
- Pal (surname), an Indian surname
- Gadaria (or Pal), an Indian shepherd caste
- Pål Lydersen (born 1965), a Norwegian footballer
- Tamara Pál (born 2000), a Hungarian handballer
- Signature of Jean de Paleologu (1855–1942), a Romanian poster artist

== Places ==
=== India ===
- Pal, Gujarat
- Pal, Jalgaon district, Maharashtra
- Pali, Maharashtra
- Pal State, a former princely state

=== Elsewhere ===
- Pal, Andorra
- Pal, Iran
- PAL Stadium, San Jose, California, United States
- State of Palestine (UNDP short-name in file title and the document code: PAL)

== Science and technology ==
=== Computer programming and electronics ===
- PAL (programming language)
- PDP-8 Assembly Language, a language used for programming the PDP-8 computer
- Programmable Array Logic, a type of programmable logic device

=== Medicine ===
- Physical activity level, a way of expressing a person's daily physical activity
- Progressive addition lenses, eyeglass lenses with a gradient of increasing lens power
- Pyothorax-associated lymphoma, a form of diffuse large B-cell lymphoma associated with chronic inflammation

=== Other uses in science and technology ===
- Paleolithic, an archaeological period
- Permissive action link, a security device for nuclear weapons
- Phenylalanine ammonia-lyase, a class of enzymes
- Phenyl Amine Library, a library of in vitro release data on monoamine releasing agents

== Transportation ==
=== Aviation ===
- PAL Airlines, Canada
- PAL Airlines (Chile)
- Philippine Airlines, Philippines
  - PAL Express, their low-cost brand
- Pilot-activated lighting, an Airport runway lighting system
- Captain Germán Olano Moreno Air Base, Cundinamarca, Colombia (IATA code: PAL)

=== Other uses in transportation ===
- PAL Indonesia, a shipyard company
- Premier Automobiles Limited, a vehicle manufacturer in India
- Palmers Green railway station, London, England (National Rail code: PAL)

== Other uses ==
- Pal, another term for a friend
- Pal, a dog food brand from Pedigree Petfoods
- Pals battalion, a type of British World War I army unit
- Possession and acquisition licence, a Canadian firearms licence
- Powered access licence, a lifting device licence

== See also ==
- Pall (disambiguation)
