= Pale =

Pale may refer to:

== Jurisdictions ==
The Pale (meaning fence) referred to areas under a specific jurisdiction or rules.

- The Pale of Calais, in France (1360–1558)
- The Pale of Settlement, area of permitted Jewish settlement, western Russian Empire (1791–1915)
- The Pale (Ireland)

== Geography ==
=== Africa ===
- Palé, town in Guinea
- San Antonio de Palé, town on Annobon Island, Equatorial Guinea

=== Asia ===
- Burma
  - Pale, Myanmar, town
  - Pale Township
- India
  - Pale, Dahanu, village
  - Pale, Goa, census town

=== Europe ===
- Pale (Greece), ancient town in Kefalonia, today part of Lixouri, Greece
- Pale, Republika Srpska, Bosnia and Herzegovia, a town and municipality
- Pale, Bosnian-Podrinje Canton Goražde
- Palé, Hungary, a village
- Pāle parish, Latvia
- Pale River, Estonia
- Pale-Prača, Bosnia and Herzegovina, a municipality

== Arts, entertainment, and media ==
=== Music ===
- Pale (album), a 1990 release of Toad the Wet Sprocket
- The Pale (band), an Irish band formed in 1990
- The Pale, renamed The Pale Pacific, an American indie rock band
- The Pale (EP), by William Control
- "Pale", a track by Within Temptation from The Silent Force

=== Other arts, entertainment, and media ===
- Pale (Greyhawk), the Theocracy of the Pale, a fictional nation in the Dungeons and Dragons role-playing game
- The Pale, an otherworldly location in Disco Elysium

== Other uses ==
- Pale (heraldry), a vertical mark running down the centre of a flag or shield
- Pálē (in Greek: πάλη), the Greek name for ancient Greek wrestling
- Pallor, a paleness of the skin

== See also ==
- Pail (disambiguation)
- Paleness (disambiguation)
- Beyond the Pale (disambiguation)
