= Guðrún Þorgerður Larsen =

Icelandic academic

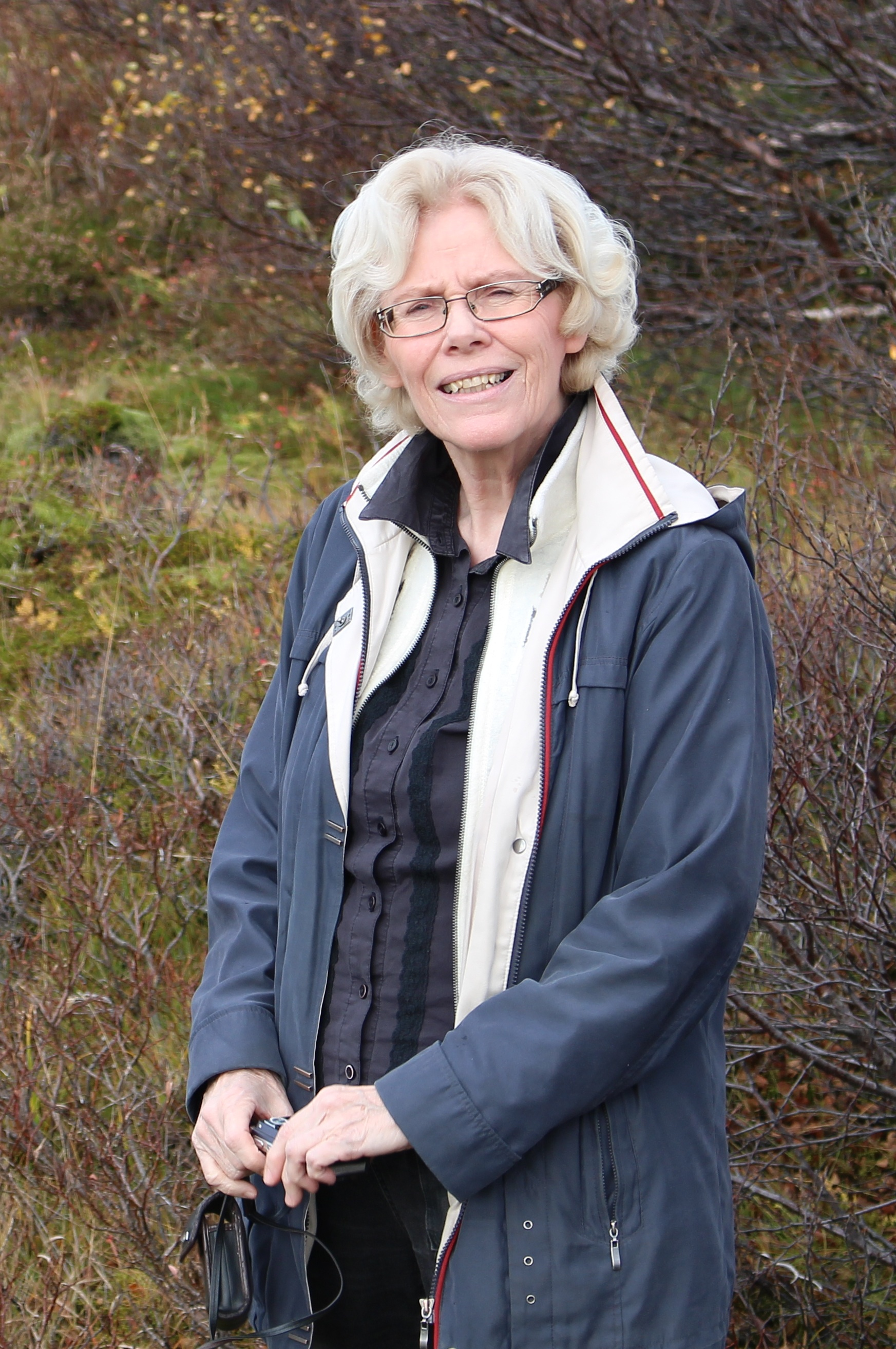
- Born: 1 November 1945 (age 80); Akureyri, Iceland
- Occupations: professor emerita at the School of Engineering and Natural Sciences at the University of Iceland

Guðrún Þorgerður Larsen OTF (Gudrún Larsen; born 1 November 1945) is a research scientist emerita at the School of Engineering and Natural Sciences at the University of Iceland.

== Professional experience ==
Guðrún completed a matriculation examination at Menntaskólinn á Akureyri (Akureyri Junior College) in the spring of 1964. She graduated with a BS in Geology in 1975 and a fourth year degree (B.Sc. Honours equivalent) in Tephrochronology in 1978. She engaged in part-time graduate studies at the University of Edinburgh from 1998 to 2002. In the summer of 1974, Guðrún researched Mt. Hekla eruptions at the University of Iceland's Science Institute, and the following summer, she researched the eruption history of Katla. The winter of 1975–1976, she taught mathematics at Kvennaskólinn in Reykjavík (Reykjavik Women's Gymnasium). However, in June 1976, she began working at the Nordic Volcanological Institute, hosted by the University of Iceland. She worked there until 1990, first as a grant recipient and later as a research scientist. From 1990 to 2004, she worked as a researcher at the Science Institute, University of Iceland, department of Geology, and from 2004 to 2015 at UI’s Institute of Earth Sciences, where she now continues research as a retired scientist. Guðrún, along with others, built up teaching in volcanology at the division of Geology and Geography Department, and taught part-time from 1988 to 2005. She has also supervised geology students on BS, MS and PhD projects in the field of volcanology.

== Areas of research ==
Guðrún has focused her main research on the field of volcanology, especially studies of tephra layers and tephrochronology, major explosive volcanic eruptions, and the eruption histories of volcanic systems in the Eastern Volcanic Zone in South Iceland and volcanoes under Vatnajökull Glacier. The goal is to increase knowledge of volcanic activity after the Ice Age ended, especially in the Eastern Volcanic Zone (the most active volcanic area in Iceland), as well as environmental changes resulting from volcanic activity and the risk of such changes in the future.

Guðrún has authored or co-authored more than 120 scientific articles and book-chapters in foreign and Icelandic journals and books, and in e-zine on volcanic activity in Iceland. In addition, she has authored or co-authored more than 30 research reports and about 300 scientific conference abstracts as well as several geologic maps. In addition to various cooperative projects in Iceland and other countries, she has participated in international cooperative projects supported by the European Union, e.g., HOLSMEER (Late HOLocene Shallow Marine Environments of EuRope 2000-2004, Fifth Framework Programme), PACLIVA (PAtterns of CLImate Variability in the north Atlantic 2002-2006, Fifth Framework Programme) and Millennium (European Climate of the last Millennium, 2006-2009, Sixth Framework Programme).

One aspect of Guðrún's research has related to risk assessment and information to civil authorities and the public. She has worked on risk assessment regarding volcanic eruptions within Mýrdalsjökull Glacier and Eyjafjallajökull Glacier, for the Civil Protection Division of the National Commissioner of the Icelandic Police, attended meetings of the Science Committee on Civil Protection and presented findings there as well as at public meetings. She has given informative talks on volcanic activity, eruptions, selected volcanoes, individual eruptions and the consequences of them and volcanic ash fall, to provide information to civil protection committees, the public, and foreign and Icelandic professional associations and groups. The most recent project in this field was an e-zine on volcanic activity in Iceland, “Catalogue of Icelandic Volcanoes”, in cooperation with the Icelandic Meteorological Office, Institute of Earth Sciences of the University of Iceland, and Civil Protection Department of National Commissioner of the Icelandic Police.

== Other work and projects ==
Guðrún was one of the editors of an e-zine on volcanic activity in Iceland, Catalogue of Icelandic Volcanoes, along with Evgenía Ilyinskaya and Magnús T. Guðmundsson. She has been a guest editor of journals and supervised conference abstract volumes. She has also been involved in organising multinational conferences in Iceland. The last one was the 30th Nordic Geological Winter Meeting in Reykjavik, January 2012.

== Merits ==
- In 2016, Guðrún won the Ása Guðmundsdóttir Wright Prize. This prize goes to Icelandic scientists who have achieved outstanding results in their field of science or knowledge and disseminated them for progress in Icelandic society. She won the prize for her research on volcanic activity and the eruption histories of Icelandic volcanoes, especially on explosive eruptions and tephra layers. Examples include volcanoes under Vatnajökull Glacier, which she thinks will continue being visibly active the next several years or decades.
- In 2018, she was made an honorary member of INQUA International Focus Group on Tephrochronology and Volcanism (INTAV).
- In 2026, Guðrún was awarded the Order of the Falcon by the President of Iceland, Halla Tómasdóttir, for her contributions to the geosciences and civil protection.

== Personal life ==
Guðrún is married to Aðalsteinn Eiríksson, former principal of Reykjavík Women's Gymnasium. They have two children and five grandchildren.
