= Dushmani =

Dushmani may refer to:

- Dushmani (tribe), an Albanian tribe
- Dushmani family, noble family in Albania
- Dushmani: A Violent Love Story, a 1996 Bollywood film
- Dushmani (film), a 2002 Bollywood film by Imran Khalid, starring Mithun Chakraborty

== See also ==
- Dushman (disambiguation)
