= Þóra =

Þóra is a given name. Notable people with the name include:

- Steinunn Þóra Árnadóttir (born 1977), Icelandic politician, former member of the Althing
- Þóra Arnórsdóttir (born 1975), Icelandic documentary film maker
- Margrét Þóra Hallgrímsson (1930–2020), Icelandic socialite and aristocrat
- Kristín Þóra Haraldsdóttir (born 1982), Icelandic actress and musician
- Þóra Björg Helgadóttir (born 1981), Icelandic footballer
- Þóra Kristín Jónsdóttir (born 1997), Icelandic basketball player
- Valdís Þóra Jónsdóttir (born 1989), Icelandic professional golfer
- Þóra Magnúsdóttir (born 1100), daughter of King Magnus III of Norway
- Þóra Melsteð or Thora Melsted (1823–1919), Icelandic educator
- Þóra Þorbergsdóttir (1025–1066), Norwegian royal consort

== See also ==
- Þóra borgarhjǫrtr, mythical character in the Norse sagas, wife of Ragnar Loðbrók
