= Páll Ólafsson =

Páll Ólafsson may refer to:

- Páll Ólafsson (handballer) (born 1960), Icelandic Olympic handballer
- Páll Ólafsson (poet) (1827–1905), Icelandic poet
