= Reykjavík Women's Gymnasium =

Coordinates: 64.1439°N 21.9390°W

The Women's Junior College in Reykjavik
- Kvennaskólinn í Reykjavík

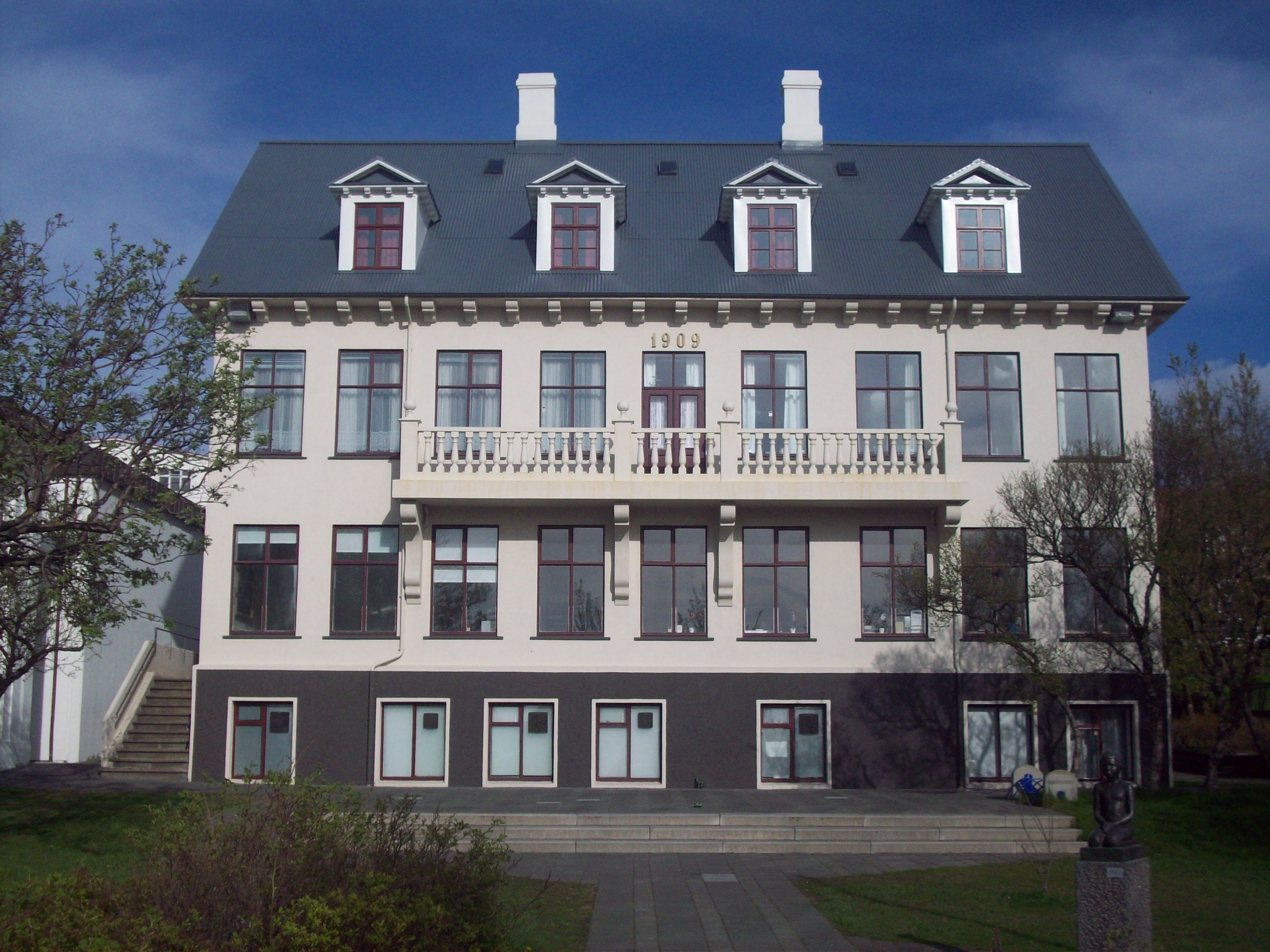
- Kvennaskólinn í Reykjavík

Location
- Fríkirkjuvegur 9 Hlemmur; Reykjavík; Iceland

Information
- Established: 1874
- Schoolmaster: Hjalti Jón Sveinsson
- Gender: mixed
- Age range: Around 15–19
- Song: Kvennaskólinn minn
- Nickname: Kvennó
- Website: kvenno.is

The Women's Junior College in Reykjavik (Icelandic: Kvennaskólinn í Reykjavík) is the first junior college for women in Iceland. It was founded in 1874 by Þóra Melsteð and Páll Melsteð, as a private school. For the first four years the school was located in the home of the founders near the Parliament Building in the center of Reykjavík. In 1909, it was moved to a new building at Fríkirkjuvegur and the primary offering became domestic science. The curriculum was later expanded to include liberal arts.

Between 1911 and 1942, the school home economics department was one of its primary offerings, but that course was discontinued when the Húsmæðraskóli was built. In 1946 the school became part of the public education system of Iceland, admitting girls who had passed their primary school examinations. Completion of the school's four-year program conferred a certificate, which was usually called "Kvennaskólapróf". With the passage of the Primary School Act in 1977, the first boy was admitted and the school began offering coeducational curricula. Simultaneously, the school established a two-year division for a social services certificate and in 1979, a third study area, resulting in a university entrance examination certificate being added.

Currently the school offers three academic focal areas: languages, natural sciences or social sciences. It is a three-year school offering general education equivalent to the US 11th and 12th grades of high school plus a two-year junior college program, or the last three years of British grammar school plus the first year of university study. The degree awarded upon completion is now called a stúdentspróf which is a pre-university entrance examination equivalent.

== Alumni ==
- Theodóra Thoroddsen, poet
