= Pal (given name) =

Pal is a masculine given name which may refer to:

- Pal Aron (born 1971), British actor
- Pal Dukagjini (1411–1458), Albanian nobleman
- Pal Dushmani (died 1457), Albanian clergyman
- Pal Engjëlli (1416–1470), Albanian clergyman
- Pal Gazulli (1405–1470), Albanian clergyman
- Pal Gropa, 13th-14th century Albanian lord
- Pal Homonai (1904–2010), Albanian artist
- Pal Kastrioti, Albanian ruler
- Pal Mirashi (1925–2001), Albanian footballer
- Pal Rakes, American singer
- Pal Sam Oeun, Cambodian politician
- Pal Shazar (born 1952), American musician
- Pal Singh Purewal, Canadian scholar
- Pal Sinn (born 1959), Hong Kong musician

== See also ==
- Pál, a Hungarian masculine given name
- Paul (name)
