= Páll Melsteð =

Páll Melsteð may refer to:

- Páll Melsteð (amtmann) (1791–1861), Icelandic official and politician
- Páll Melsteð (historian) (1812–1910), Icelandic historian and son of the above
