= Antonio Dusmani =

Antonio Lefcochilo Dusmani (Greek: Αντώνιος Λευκόχειλος Δούσμανης, Antonios Lefkocheilos Dousmanis; Albanian: Antonio Dushmani; c. 1800–1890) KCMG was a Count of Corfu and politician of the United States of the Ionian Islands.

== Life ==
A descendant of a branch of the Dushmani family, he was born in Corfu around 1800 as a member of the local Venetian nobility. His aunt was married to the writer Lorenzo Mabilli. Dusmani's grandchildren include Viktor and Sofoklis Dousmanis.

In 1833, Dusmani was appointed under-secretary of the Ionian Senate, and in 1834, he became the secretary of the political department. He became the secretary of the general department in 1853, while from 1841 to 1857 he served as secretary of the general commission on public instruction. For his services to the British crown, he was appointed Knight Commander of the Order of St Michael and St George on 26 September 1849. After the union of the Ionian Islands with Greece in 1864, Dusmani translated the records of William Ewart Gladstone's mission to the Ionian Islands from English to Italian and published them in 1869.
