= Viktor Dousmanis =

Greek lieutenant general

- Βίκτωρ Δούσμανης
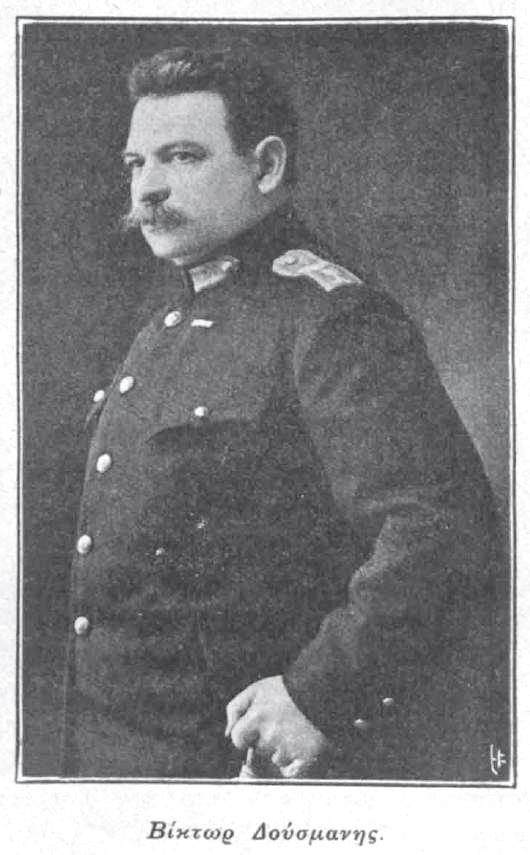
- Viktor Dousmanis c. 1914/16
- Born: c. 1861; Corfu, United States of the Ionian Islands (now Greece)
- Died: c. 1949 (aged 88); Athens, Kingdom of Greece
- Burial place: First Cemetery of Athens
- Education: Hellenic Military Academy
- Relatives: Sofoklis Dousmanis (brother)
- Military career
- Allegiance: Kingdom of Greece
- Branch: Hellenic Army
- Service years: 1883–1917; 1920–1922
- Rank: Lieutenant General
- Commands: Army of Thessaly; Chief of Army General Staff
- Wars: Greco-Turkish War (1897); Balkan Wars: First Balkan War; Second Balkan War; World War I; National Schism; Noemvriana; Greco-Turkish War (1919-1922)
- Awards: Order of the White Eagle; Legion of Honour
- Other work: Author

Viktor Dousmanis (Greek: Βίκτωρ Δούσμανης, 1861–1949) was a Hellenic Army officer, who rose to the rank of Lieutenant General. He distinguished himself as a staff officer during the Balkan Wars and became a leading monarchist during the National Schism, serving three terms as Chief of the Hellenic Army General Staff.

== Life ==
He was born in Corfu in c. 1861, a descendant of a branch of the Albanian Dushmani family that had emigrated to the island in the 15th century; he is the elder brother of Sofoklis Dousmanis and grandson of Antonio Dusmani.

He entered the Hellenic Military Academy, from which he graduated on 11 July 1883 as an engineer 2nd lieutenant. Promoted to lieutenant in 1886 and captain in 1890, he participated in the Greco-Turkish War of 1897 as an officer in the staff of the Army of Thessaly under the Greek commander-in-chief, Crown Prince Constantine. After the war, he was charged with writing the official report. In 1899–1904, he served as section head of the Staff Service of the Greek Ministry of Military Affairs, and in 1904, with the foundation of the Army General Staff, he was transferred to the newly created general staff corps. Among his duties there was the organization of the National Defence Fund (Ταμείον Εθνικής Αμύνης). He was promoted to major in 1906 and lieutenant colonel in 1909.

During the First Balkan War of 1912–1913 against the Ottoman Empire, he was chief of operations for the main Greek force, the Army of Thessaly, again under Crown Prince Constantine. In the Second Balkan War against Bulgaria in the summer of 1913, he served as chief of staff to the field army, again under Constantine, who had by now become King. In the same year, he was promoted to colonel and then to Major General. In early 1914 he was appointed chief of the General Staff Service, but resigned in November after a quarrel with Prime Minister Eleftherios Venizelos over the issue of Greece's entry into World War I. Venizelos favoured siding with the Entente Powers, especially Britain, for the upcoming Gallipoli Campaign while Dousmanis, a believer in the victory of Germany, advocated neutrality.

In February 1915, however, Venizelos was forced to resign over the same issue by King Constantine, and Dousmanis resumed his post, which he held until mid-August 1916. Having sided with Constantine during the National Schism, in June 1917, when Venizelos assumed the governance of the country and led it to war on the side of the Entente, Dousmanis, along with other prominent monarchists, was deported to Corsica. Returning to Greece after the end of the war, in 1919 he was sentenced by a Venizelist court martial to life imprisonment for high treason. Following Venizelos' downfall in the November 1920 elections, he was released from prison, and, promoted to lieutenant general, he was reappointed as chief of the general staff in April 1921, during the Asia Minor Campaign against Turkey. He held this post until October 1921, and again from 22 August 1922, when the Greek front in Anatolia collapsed in the face of the Turkish offensive, until 15 September, when he was forced to resign along with the government by the Venizelist-led 11 September 1922 Revolution from the defeated Greek troops. He was permanently discharged on 2 November 1922, and dedicated his last years to writing on military and historical issues. He died in 1949. He was awarded Serbian Order of the White Eagle among other decorations.

== Works ==
- Γεωδαισία ("Geodesy")
- Στρατηγικαί τακτικαί οδηγίαι ("Strategic tactical instructions")
- Ιστορία του πολέμου του 1913 ("History of the War of 1913")
- Iστορία και Γεωγραφία της Θεσσαλίας ("History and Geography of Thessaly")
- Η Εσωτερική Όψις της Μικρασιατικής Εκστρατείας ("The Inner View of the Asia Minor Campaign")

== Sources ==
- Συνοπτική Ιστορία του Γενικού Επιτελείου Στρατού 1901–2001 [A Concise History of the Hellenic Army General Staff 1901–2001] (in Greek). Athens: Hellenic Army History Directorate. 2001. ISBN 960-7897-44-7.
