= Beyond the Pale Publications =

Beyond the Pale was a publication company based in Northern Ireland which operated from 1988 to 2009. Their publications usually focused on controversial issues such as the troubles.

The name refers to the idiom "beyond the pale".
