= Sofoklis Dousmanis =

Greek admiral and politician (1869–1952)

- Σοφοκλής Δούσμανης
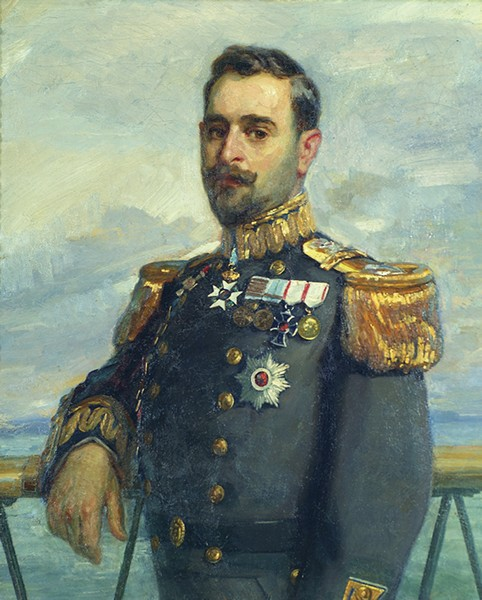
- Sofoklis Dousmanis in admiral's dress uniform, portrait by Georgios Roilos

Minister of Naval Affairs
- In office 10 March – 10 October 1935
- President: Alexandros Zaimis
- Prime Minister: Panagis Tsaldaris
- Preceded by: Alexandros Hatzikyriakos
- Succeeded by: Georgios Kondylis

Personal details
- Born: 25 December 1868 Corfu, Kingdom of Greece
- Died: 6 January 1952 (aged 83) Athens, Kingdom of Greece
- Relations: Viktor Dousmanis (brother); Dushmani family
- Education: Hellenic Naval Academy
- Awards: Grand Commander of the Order of the Redeemer

Military service
- Allegiance: Kingdom of Greece; Second Hellenic Republic
- Branch/service: Royal Hellenic Navy
- Years of service: 1888–1917; 1920–23; 1935
- Rank: Admiral
- Commands: Nafkratousa; Psara; Sfaktiria; Georgios Averof; Chief of Staff of the Exercise Squadron; Chief of Hellenic Navy General Staff
- Battles/wars: Greco-Turkish War (1897); Balkan Wars; First Balkan War; First Battle of Lemnos; Battle of Elli; Second Battle of Lemnos; Second Balkan War; Greco-Turkish War (1919-1922); Occupation of Constantinople

Sofoklis Dousmanis (Greek: Σοφοκλής Δούσμανης, 25 December 1868 – 6 January 1952) was a Greek naval officer. Distinguished in the Balkan Wars, he became twice the chief of the Greek Navy General Staff, and occupied the post of Minister for Naval Affairs in 1935.

== Life ==
Sofoklis Dousmanis was born in Corfu on 25 December 1868, a descendant of a branch of the Albanian Dushmani family that had emigrated to Corfu in the 15th century; he was the grandson of Antonio Dusmani and brother of Viktor Dousmanis.

He entered the Hellenic Naval Academy on 20 May 1884 and graduated on 18 June 1888 as a Line Ensign. He was subsequently promoted to Sub-Lieutenant (8 January 1890), Lieutenant (14 November 1896), Lt. Commander (6 May 1905), and Commander (29 March 1910). He served aboard various ships and in staff positions, including as instructor at the Navy Academy (1908–09), and as captain of the destroyer Nafkratousa (1906), the ironclad Psara (1910–11), the troop carrier Sfaktiria (1911 and 1912), and of the newly delivered cruiser Georgios Averof (1911), as well as chief of staff of the Exercise Squadron (1911).

With the outbreak of the First Balkan War in October 1912, he became captain of Averof as well as chief of staff to the Aegean Fleet commander, Rear Admiral Pavlos Koundouriotis, who used the Averof as his flagship. In this capacity he participated in the two victorious naval battles of Elli and Lemnos, as well as the capture of several Aegean islands as well as Mount Athos, Kavala and Dedeagatch.

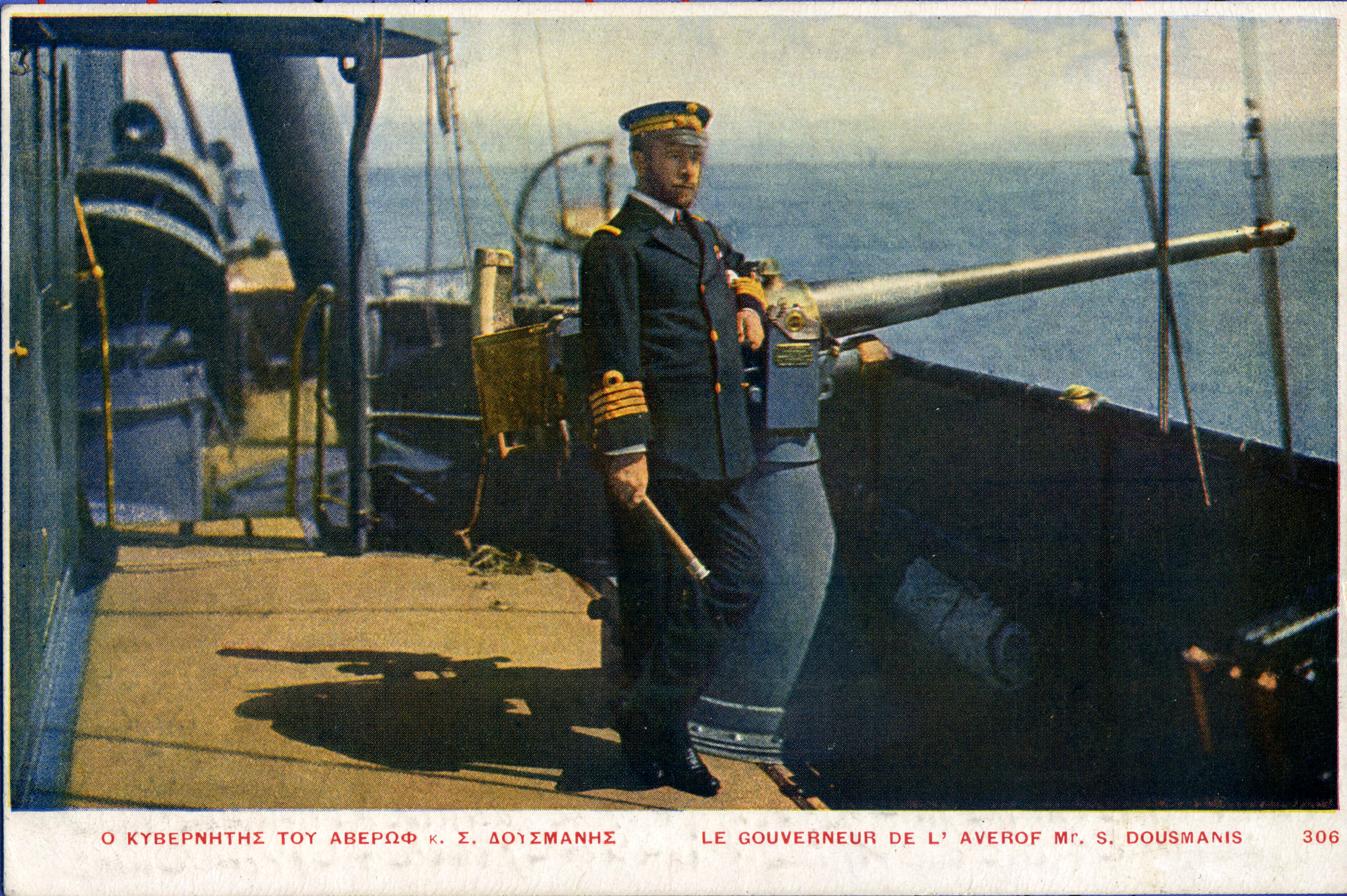
Sofoklis Dousmanis c. 1915

On 2 June 1913, he was promoted to Captain, and to Rear Admiral on 15 April 1914. After briefly assuming command of the Battleship Squadron, he was appointed Chief of the Navy General Staff in June 1914, serving until the resignation of King Constantine I and the assumption of government by Eleftherios Venizelos in June 1917. The new government placed him on suspended service and retired him on 20 October 1917, followed by internal exile in 1918–20. After the Venizelist electoral defeat in November 1920 and the return of King Constantine, he was recalled to active service (6 November 1920) and served as Chief of the Aegean Fleet (January–April 1921), which he led in the attempts to stop the seaborne resupply of Mustafa Kemal's Turkish National Movement, and again Chief of the Navy General Staff (December 1921-October 1922). After the Greek defeat in the Asia Minor Campaign and the 11 September 1922 Revolution, he was again placed into suspended service and retired on 19 January 1923 as Vice Admiral.

On 2 March 1935, he became Minister for Naval Affairs in the Panagis Tsaldaris cabinet, a post he kept until the government's resignation on 10 October 1935. On 25 March 1935, he was recalled to active service as a full Admiral for exceptional service, remaining in active commission until 20 November 1935.

In 1939, he edited and published the Averof's captain's log during the Balkan Wars period.

He died in Athens in 1952.

== Sources ==
Political offices
Preceded by Alexandros Hatzikyriakos	Minister for Naval Affairs; 10 March – 10 October 1935	Succeeded by Georgios Kondylis
Military offices
Preceded by Rear Admiral Dimitrios Papachristos	Chief of the Navy General Staff; 19 June 1914 – 14 June 1917	Succeeded by Captain Georgios Kakoulidis
Preceded by Rear Admiral Konstantinos Malikopoulos	Chief of the Navy General Staff; 15 December 1921 – 12 October 1922	Succeeded by Captain Agisilaos Gerontas
