= Dushman =

Dushman may refer to:

== Films and television ==
- Dushman (1939 film), an Indian Hindi-language film starring K. L. Saigal
- Dushman (1957 film), an Indian Hindi-language film starring Dev Anand
- Dushmun, a 1972 Indian Hindi-language film starring Rajesh Khanna
- The Enemy (1979 film) (Turkish: Düşman), a Turkish drama film
- Dushman (1990 film), an Indian Hindi-language film directed by Shakti Samanta
- Dushman (1998 film), an Indian Hindi-language film starring Kajol and Sanjay Dutt
- Dushman (TV series), a 2022 Pakistani drama series

== People ==
- David Dushman (1923–2021), German Red Army soldier and fencing trainer
- Saul Dushman (1883–1954), Russian-American physical chemist

== See also ==
- Dushmani (disambiguation)
- Dushmun, a 1972 Indian Hindi-language film starring Rajesh Khanna
