= Dousmanis =

Dousmanis (Greek: Δούσμανης) is a Greek surname. Notable people with the surname include:

- Sofoklis Dousmanis (1868–1952), Greek naval officer, brother of Viktor
- Viktor Dousmanis (1861–1949), Greek military officer
