= Pell Mell =

Pell Mell may refer to:

- Pell Mell, a German progressive rock band formed in 1971 in Marburg, Germany
- Pell Mell (band), a US instrumental rock music ensemble formed 1980 in Portland, Oregon
- Pel Mel, an Australian new wave/post-punk band formed in 1979 in Newcastle, New South Wales
- Pell-Mell & Woodcote, the Royal Automobile Club's quarterly magazine

== See also ==
- Pall mall (disambiguation)
