= Paleness =

Paleness may refer to:

- Pallor, a medical condition
- Paleness (color)

== See also ==
- Pale (disambiguation)
