= Pall mall =

Pall mall, paille maille, palle malle, etc., may refer to:

- Pall-mall, a lawn game related to croquet, the source of later uses

== Places ==
- Pall Mall, London, a street in the City of Westminster, London
- Pall Mall, a long-running farm near Tywyn, Gwynedd, Wales, named after the London street
- Pall Mall, Tennessee, a small unincorporated community in Fentress County, Tennessee
- Pall Mall (Bendigo), urban downtown area of Bendigo, Australia

== Media ==
- The Pall Mall Gazette, an evening newspaper founded in London on 7 February 1865
- The Pall Mall Magazine, a monthly British literary magazine published between 1893 and 1914

== Sports ==
- Pall Mall (horse) (1955–1978), horse that won the 2000 Guineas Stakes in 1958
- Pall Mall Stakes, a prestigious greyhound racing competition

== Other ==
- Pall Mall (cigarette), a brand of cigarettes produced by R. J. Reynolds Tobacco Company
- Pall Mall Restaurant, a hostelry on Cockspur Street, Westminster, London
- Pall mall, a cocktail with gin

== See also ==
- 30 Pall Mall, an office building approved for construction in the commercial district of Liverpool, England
- Pale Male (born 1990), red-tailed hawk that lives in New York City
- Pell Mell (disambiguation)
