= 1920 in Greece =

- Decades: 1900s; 1910s; 1920s; 1930s; 1940s
- See also: Other events of 1920; List of years in Greece

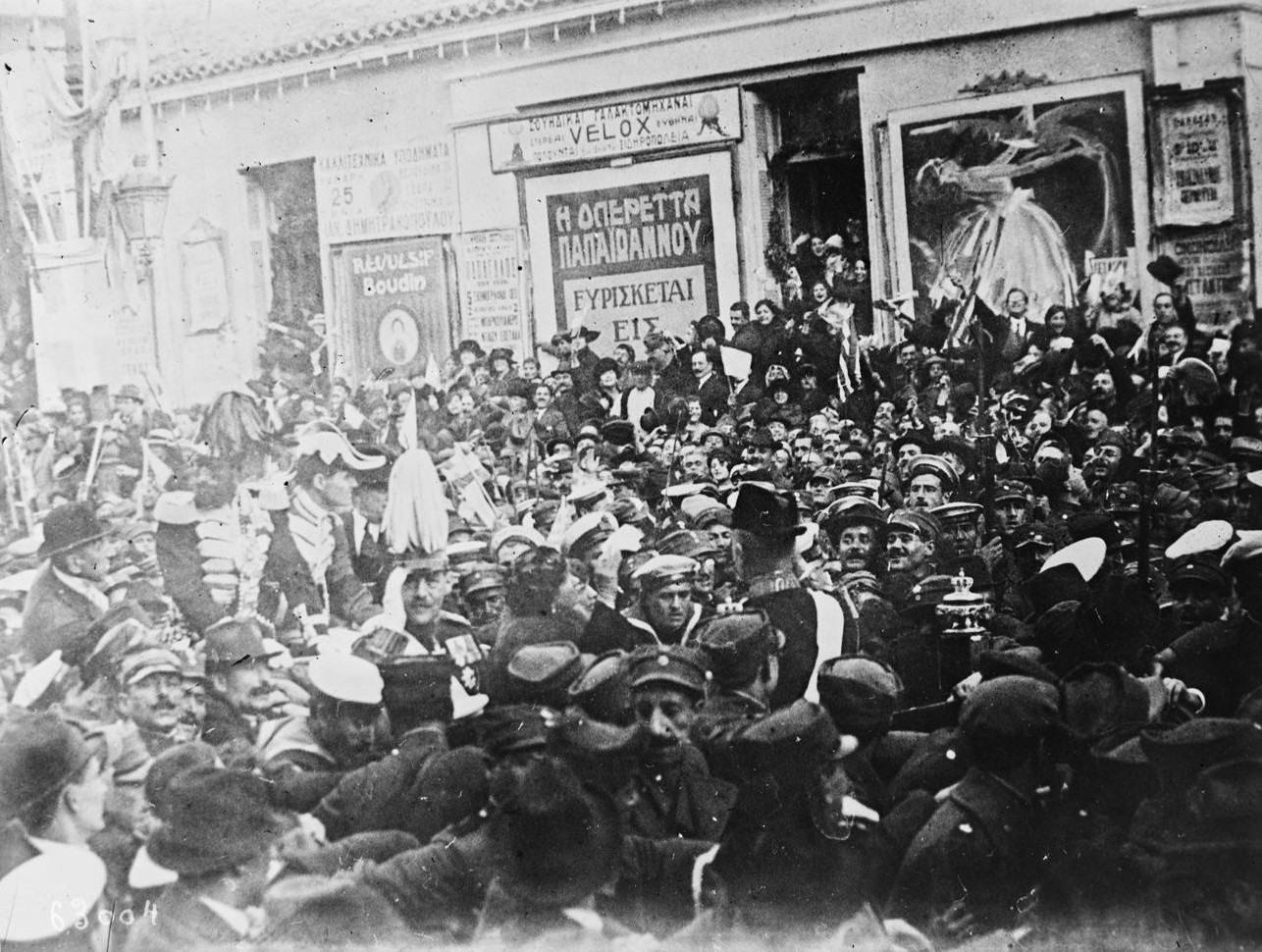
Return of King Constantine I from exile to Athens, December 1920

The following lists events that happened during 1920 in Greece.

During 1920, a number of changes took place in Greece. On a regional level, Greece struck several favorable bargains and treaties in the aftermath of World War I through the statesmanlike qualities and the tact of the Greek prime minister, Eleftherios Venizelos.

== Incumbents ==
- Monarch:
  - Alexander (until 25 October)
  - Constantine I (starting 19 December)
- Prime Minister:
  - Eleftherios Venizelos (until 17 November)
  - Dimitrios Rallis (starting 17 November)

== First half of 1920 ==
During the first half of the year Greece was chiefly occupied with establishing its position at Smyrna and in taking over the other territories which had been allotted to it by the Supreme Council. It was decided that the portion of Thrace which had been taken from Bulgaria should be given to Greece, and Greece was authorized to occupy this district at the end of May. Turkish Thrace, including the great town of Adrianople, was also assigned to Greece and was occupied by that country at the end of July. Greece thus extended its dominions to the coast of the Black Sea.

During the summer it was announced that King Alexander had contracted a morganatic marriage with a certain Mlle Manos in the previous November.

== Attempted assassination ==
While Venizelos was in Paris in August an attempt was made to assassinate him, and it was reported that the criminals were adherents of the royalist cause. The publication in Athens of the news of the attempted assassination led to outbreaks of serious riots against real and supposed partisans of ex-King Constantine.

== Meeting of parliament ==
Fortunately Venizelos was not seriously wounded and he was able to attend the meeting of parliament on September 7. The prime minister received an extremely enthusiastic welcome in the Chamber of Deputies, and a speech of welcome was made by the president of the house, who proposed a resolution proclaiming that the prime minister was the saviour of Greece, and that a permanent memorial should be erected to him in the Chamber. It is worth recording that this resolution was passed unanimously. Venizelos then rose to reply to the president and to thank the Chamber for its welcome, and also to present three treaties to parliament. The treaties in question were that with Turkey, that with the Great Powers relating to the transfer from them to Greece of the portion of Thrace which had been ceded to the Powers by Bulgaria; and, thirdly, one with Italy regarding the Dodecanese. The first two of these treaties at any rate were thoroughly satisfactory to Greece, and were certainly a monument to Venizelos's statesmanship. The prime minister said that since the Chamber was to be dissolved within a few days there would not be time for the ratification of these treaties, but this need not be regarded as a serious matter, because so far as the territorial sections of the agreements were concerned, the treaties had already been carried into effect. Venizelos said that so soon as the Chamber was dissolved, martial law and the censorship would be abolished, and the general election would be held in the autumn. Replying to the charges of his opponents, Venizelos said that he would guarantee that the elections would be held under conditions of absolute liberty.

== The Chamber of Deputies ==
The last ordinary sitting of the Chamber was on September 23. It is perhaps worth recording here that the Chamber which was now dissolved was that which had been elected in 1915 and had been dissolved by King Constantine in the following year, and had then been recalled by Venizelos in 1917. The issue of the general election was therefore fraught with the greatest possible interest.

In consequence of the peculiar history of the Chamber of Deputies which was being dissolved, the elections would under any circumstances have been of the very greatest importance to the country, but they were rendered even more critical by the tragic event which intervened between the dissolution of parliament and the day of the elections. The event in question was the death of King Alexander.

== The death of the King ==
The king's death took place under the most tragic and unusual circumstances. On October 2 the king was walking in the grounds of the Royal Gardens behind the Royal Palace, when his pet dog was attacked by a monkey. The king endeavoured to separate the animals, and was himself badly bitten by another monkey. It was at first thought that his wounds were not serious, but blood poison ensued, and it was soon realized that the king's condition was critical. The best medical assistance was obtained from Paris, but the efforts of the physicians were unavailing and King Alexander died on October 25.

King Alexander was the second son of ex-King Constantine and ex-Queen Sophie, sister of the ex-Emperor Wilhelm II of Germany. He was proclaimed king of the Greeks in June 1917. He had gained the sympathy of many people, both in Greece and abroad, by his romantic marriage with Mlle Aspasia Manos.

The election campaign was already proceeding when the king died, but the date of the elections was postponed, and Venizelos summoned the Chamber to meet for a special session on October 28. The Chamber duly met on that afternoon, but less than half the deputies were present. The prime minister announced to the deputies that King Alexander had died, and declared that in his opinion the constitutional successor to the throne was the late king's younger brother, Prince Paul. The prime minister also announced that the government had sent a message to Prince Paul offering him its sympathy on the death of his elder brother, and informing him of his succession to the Hellenic throne. The government appear to have also intimated to Prince Paul that he should not come to Greece until after the general election had proved whether the existing government enjoyed the confidence of the Greek people. Venizelos said that it was therefore necessary to elect a regent to serve during the interval, and he proposed that Admiral Pavlos Kountouriotis should be elected to that post. The few members of the opposition who were present declared that they considered that the question of the succession could be satisfactorily settled in only one way – by a vote of the entire Greek people. Admiral Kountouriotis was subsequently elected regent by a large majority of the deputies present.

== The funeral of the King ==
The funeral of King Alexander took place in the cathedral at Athens. It was, of course, one of the tragedies of the late king's position that none of his nearest relatives could be present either during his last illness or at the funeral. Ex-King Constantine, Ex-Queen Sophie, the ex-crown prince, Prince Paul, and the three princesses, were all exiled in Switzerland. The Dowager Queen Olga came to Athens, but did not arrive until after the king's death. Madame Manos was, however, constantly with her husband during his last illness. The funeral was attended by the Dowager Queen Olga, Madame Manos, Admiral Kountouriotis, the crown prince of Sweden, and Crown Prince Alexander of the Serbs, Croats, and Slovenes.

== Declaration by Prince Paul ==
The reply of Prince Paul to the message of the Greek government caused considerable perturbation in Greece and to some extent even in Europe generally. The reply was as follows:

"I declare that I do not share the point of view of the Hellenic government that, according to the constitution, I am today called upon to ascend the throne. The throne does not belong to me; it belongs to my august father King Constantine, and, constitutionally, my eldest brother is his successor. Neither of them has ever renounced his rights, but both have been obliged to leave Greece in obedience to the dictates of their patriotic duty."

Prince Paul then went on to say that he could not ascend the throne in the existing circumstances. "I would only ascend the throne if the Hellenic people were to decide that it did not want the return of my august father, and were to exclude the Crown Prince George from his right of succession."

This declaration by Prince Paul placed the government in a difficult position, and it soon became evident that there was a strong movement aiming at the restoration of King Constantine. Venizelos was quite prepared to face the issue, and the question of the return of King Constantine immediately became the real issue of the general election. Venizelos declared openly that if he and the Liberal Party were returned to power the result would be a condemnation of the claims of King Constantine. If, on the other hand, the opposition obtained a majority, he (Venizelos) would retire altogether from political life. The opposition leader came out openly in support of King Constantine.

== Georgios Streit Proclamation ==
In the meantime a proclamation was issued by Georgios Streit from Luzern. Streit was King Constantine's confidential adviser and had been foreign minister during the first part of the war when King Constantine was still on the Greek throne. Venizelos had stated that King Constantine and his advisers had undertaken obligations towards the Central Powers. In his proclamation Streit said that having been foreign minister he was in a position to give a formal denial to this statement. He said that King Constantine had undertaken before the war no engagement which could prevent the freedom of the foreign policy of the country. And that "at no moment during the war was any obligation assumed by King Constantine to fight by the side of the Central Powers, or imposing upon Greece a neutral attitude."

== The General election ==
The general election was duly held on November 1, delayed by the death and funeral of King Alexander. It had long been known to those who kept in contact with affairs in the Near East that the royalist People's Party under the leadership of Dimitrios Gounaris had never ceased to be powerful. But the result of the general election, despite the fact that the Liberal Party polled over 7,000 more votes than the United Opposition, was a sweeping victory for the opposition which came as a surprise in Great Britain. The Liberals were badly defeated in almost all parts of the country, and in some provinces they were literally crushed. It was stated that in the Peloponnesus, in Thessaly, and in Macedonia, there was not a single Venizelist candidate elected. The opposition were returned with a majority of 151, having secured a total of 261 seats.

On the following day Venizelos tendered to the regent the resignation of the Liberal cabinet. A cabinet was then formed by the aged statesman Dimitrios Rallis, who thereupon requested Admiral Kountouriotis to resign the regency. The Dowager Queen Olga was then appointed regent, in the expectation that King Constantine would soon return to Greece. Rallis arranged, however, that before King Constantine was formally invited to return to the throne, a plebiscite upon the question should be held. Venizelos left Greece and went to France.

== Results of the election ==
The result of the elections placed the Allied Powers in a somewhat difficult position. They had, of course, always favoured Venizelos, and they had certainly favoured Greece in the peace settlements. On the other hand, the Greek people appeared now to have given a decisive verdict in favour of the return of King Constantine. It was reported that the French government wished to forbid King Constantine to return. But the British and Italian governments were not in favour of placing the Allies in the position of appearing to oppose the declared wishes of the Greek people on a question which was primarily the concern of Greece. The result of these differences of opinion in the highest quarters was that a somewhat compromising proclamation was issued by the British, French, and Italian governments. The proclamation stated that the recall of King Constantine could only be regarded as a ratification by the Greek people of the actions of the king which had been hostile to the Allies. And the proclamation stated that the recall of the king would create an unfavourable situation between Greece and the Great Powers, and that in the event of that recall taking place the Great Powers would "reserve to themselves complete liberty in dealing with the situation thus created."

This proclamation made the situation difficult for Rallis, but that statesman decided to proceed with the plebiscite. This second poll of the people was held on December 5.

It was stated on behalf of the Liberals that they would refrain from taking any part in the poll. They thus confessed beforehand that they anticipated defeat. It is doubtful whether the Liberals of the rank and file obeyed the orders of their leaders to refrain from the poll. The total number of votes cast in the plebiscite appears to have been greater than in the general election a few weeks earlier. It is more probable that the Liberals of the rank and file, like their compatriots of other parties, were in truth carried away by an enthusiasm – temporary or otherwise – to see the return of the royal exile. However this may have been, there was an enormous majority in favour of King Constantine. It was stated that 1,012,742 votes were cast and that of these 999,962 were in favour of King Constantine. After a result such as this only one course of action was possible, and Rallis formally invited King Constantine to return.

== Allied powers reply ==
The Allied Powers took no definite steps to forbid this consummation, but they issued a declaration that King Constantine would not be recognized, and withdrawing the subsidies which Greece had been receiving from the Powers.

King Constantine and Queen Sophie left Switzerland, and arrived in Athens on December 19, their return to their capital being made the occasion for a tremendous demonstration of sympathy. King Constantine was received everywhere with immense enthusiasm.
