= The Pale (Ireland) =

Part of Ireland controlled by England in the Late Middle Ages

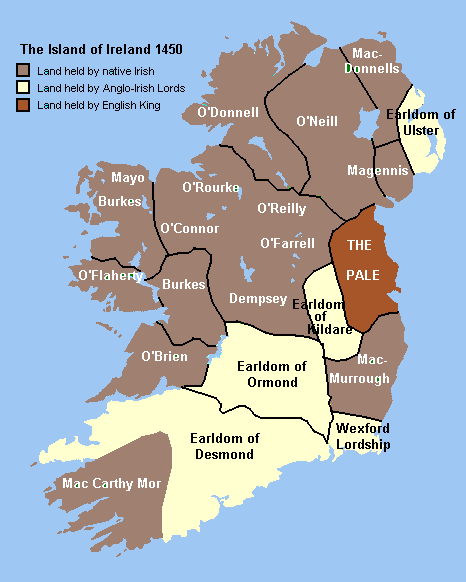
The English Pale (brown) in 1450

The Pale (Irish: An Pháil) or The English Pale (An Pháil Shasanach or An Ghalltacht) was the part of Ireland directly under the control of the English Crown in the Late Middle Ages. By the mid-15th century, direct English rule was largely restricted to the "four obedient shires", comprising most of counties Dublin, Kildare, Meath and Louth. This was the region in which English culture and English law were observed. In 1454, trenches began to be dug on the borders of this region, to prevent raids by the Gaelic Irish and Gaelicized Normans. The first recorded use of the name "English Pale" was in 1494, in an act of parliament summoned by the Lord Deputy, Edward Poynings. The region "beyond the Pale" was largely Gaelic.

The Pale was an area along the east coast, stretching north from Dalkey, just south of Dublin, to the garrison town of Dundalk. The inland boundary went to Naas and Leixlip around the Earldom of Kildare, towards Trim and north towards Kells. In this district, many townlands still have English or Norman-French names.

== Etymology ==
The word pale, meaning a fence, is derived from the Latin word pālus, meaning "stake", specifically a stake used to support a fence. A paling fence is made of pales ganged side by side, and the word palisade is derived from the same root. From this came the figurative meaning of "boundary". The Oxford English Dictionary is dubious about the popular notion that the phrase beyond the pale, as something outside the boundary—i.e., uncivilised—derives from this specific Irish meaning. Also derived from the "boundary" concept was the idea of a pale as an area within which local laws were valid. The term was used not only for the Pale in Ireland but also for various other English overseas settlements, notably English Calais. The term was also used to refer to specific regions in other nations: the term Pale of Settlement was applied to the area in the west of Imperial Russia where Jews were permitted to reside.

== History ==
The Pale was a strip of land that stretched north from Dalkey in Dublin to Dundalk in Louth; it became the base of English rule in Ireland. The Norman invasion of Ireland, beginning in 1169, created the Lordship of Ireland and brought Ireland under the theoretical control of the Plantagenet Kings of England. From the 13th century onwards, English rule in Ireland at first faltered, then waned. Across most of Ireland, the Anglo-Normans increasingly assimilated into Irish culture after 1300. They made alliances with neighbouring autonomous Gaelic lords. In the long periods when there was no large royal army in Ireland, the Anglo-Norman lords, like their Gaelic neighbours in the provinces, acted essentially as independent rulers in their own areas.

English power in Ireland was greatly weakened by the Bruce campaign (1315–1318), the Great Famine of 1315–1317, the Black Death, the Hundred Years War (1337–1453), and the Wars of the Roses (1455–85). In 1366, so that the English Crown could assert its authority over the settlers, a parliament was assembled in Kilkenny and the Statute of Kilkenny was enacted. The statute decreed that intermarriage between English settlers and Irish natives was forbidden. It also forbade the settlers from using the Irish language and adopting Irish modes of dress or other customs, as such practices were already common. The adoption of Gaelic Brehon property law, in particular, undermined the feudal nature of the Lordship. The Act was never implemented successfully. This inability to enforce the statute indicated that Ireland was withdrawing from English cultural norms, often described as the Gaelic Resurgence.

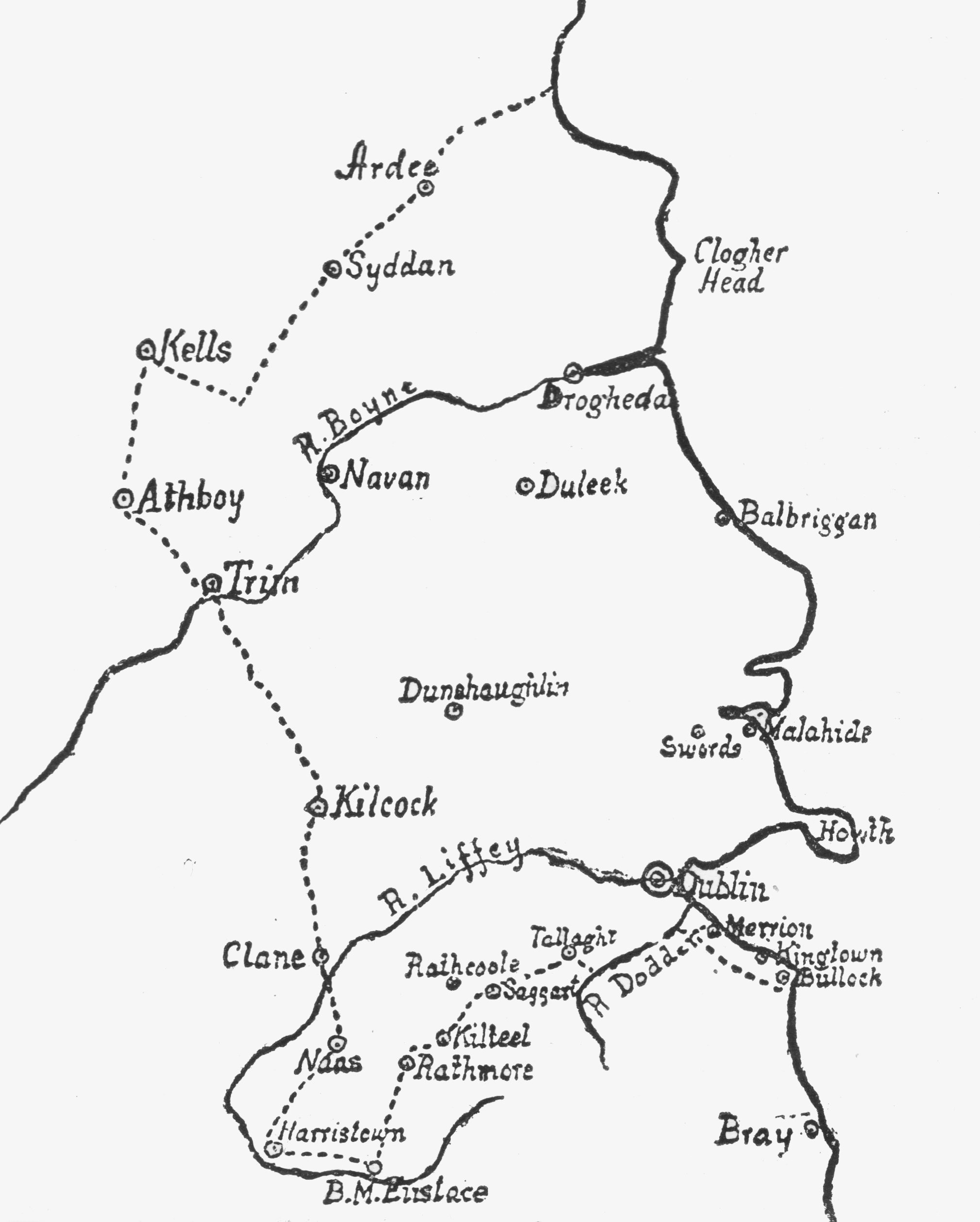
The Pale – According to Statute of 1488

By the mid-15th century, direct English rule was largely restricted to a region on the east coast, the "four obedient shires" comprising most of counties Dublin, Kildare, Meath and Louth. This was the region in which English culture and English law were observed. In 1454, commissioners were appointed to recruit workmen "to make trenches and fortresses upon the borders and marches" of these four counties, to prevent further raids by the Gaelic Irish and Gaelicized Normans. In 1494, the Lord Deputy, Edward Poynings, summoned the parliament. It passed a statute ordering "ditches to be made aboute the Inglishe pale". This is the first recorded use of the name. Poynings had been governor of the Pale of Calais before being made the English governor of Ireland. Thereafter, the territory it enclosed was known as "the English Pale".

The Pale was composed of Dublin and its surrounding area, the population of which was mainly made of Old English merchants who were loyal to the crown.

By the late 15th century, the Pale became the only part of Ireland that remained subject to the English king, with most of the island paying only token recognition of the overlordship of the English crown. The tax base shrank to a fraction of what it had been in 1300. A proverb quoted by Sir John Davies said that "whoso lives by west of the Barrow, lives west of the law."

At a higher social level, there was extensive intermarriage between the Gaelic Irish aristocracy and Anglo-Norman lords from the time of the invasion. The earls of Kildare ruled as lords deputy from 1470 (with more or less success), aided by alliances with the Gaelic lords, occasionally leading to battles such as at Knockdoe in 1504. This lasted until the 1520s, when the earls passed out of royal favour, but the 9th earl was reinstated in the 1530s. The brief revolt by his son "Silken Thomas" in 1534–35 served in the following decades to hasten the Tudor conquest of Ireland, in which Dublin and the surviving Pale were used as the crown's main military base. A book A Perambulation of Leinster, Meath, and Louth, of which consist the Pale (1596) expressed contemporary usage.

By the early 16th century, the Irish culture and language had reestablished itself in regions conquered by the Anglo-Normans: "even in the Pale, all the common folk ... for the most part are of Irish birth, Irish habit and of Irish language".

== Fortification ==
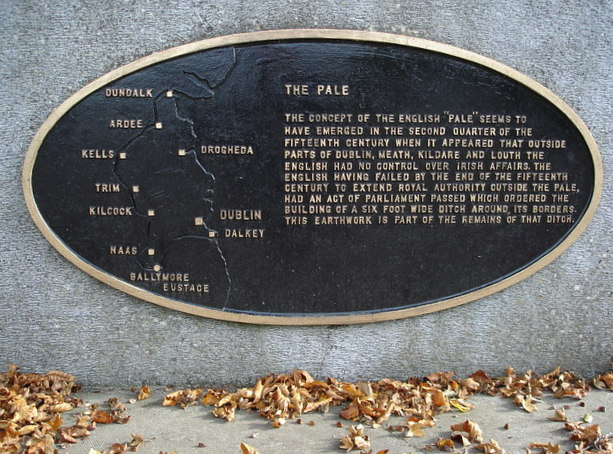
Modern plaque near Ballymore Eustace marks the end of the Pale.

The Pale boundary essentially consisted of a fortified ditch and rampart built around parts of the medieval counties of Louth, Meath, Dublin and Kildare, leaving out half of Meath, most of Kildare, and southwest County Dublin. Border or garrison towns of the Pale included Ardee, Siddan, Kells, Athboy, Trim, Kilcock, Clane, Naas, Harristown, Ballymore Eustace, Rathmore, Kilteel, Saggart, Tallaght and Dalkey. The northern frontier of the Pale was marked by the De Verdon fortress of Castle Roche, while the southern border lay slightly south of the present day M50 motorway in Dublin, which crosses the site of what was Carrickmines Castle. The following description is from The Parish of Taney: A History of Dundrum, near Dublin, and Its Neighbourhood (1895):

In the period immediately after the Norman Settlement was constructed the barrier, known as the "Pale," separating the lands occupied by the settlers from those remaining in the hands of the Irish. This barrier consisted of a ditch, raised some ten or twelve feet from the ground, with a hedge of thorn on the outer side. It was constructed, not so much to keep out the Irish, as to form an obstacle in their way in their raids on the cattle of the settlers, and thus give time for a rescue. The Pale began at Dalkey, and followed a southwesterly direction towards Kilternan; then turning northwards passed Kilgobbin, where a castle still stands, and crossed the Parish of Taney to the south of that part of the lands of Balally now called Moreen, and thence in a westerly direction to Tallaght, and on to Naas in the County of Kildare. In the wall bounding Moreen is still to be seen a small watch-tower and the remains of a guard-house adjoining it. From this point a beacon-fire would raise the alarm as far as Tallaght, where an important castle stood. A portion of the Pale is still to be seen in Kildare between Clane and Clongowes Wood College at Sallins.

Within the confines of the Pale, the leading gentry and merchants lived lives not too different from those of their counterparts in England, save for the constant fear of attack from the Gaelic Irish.

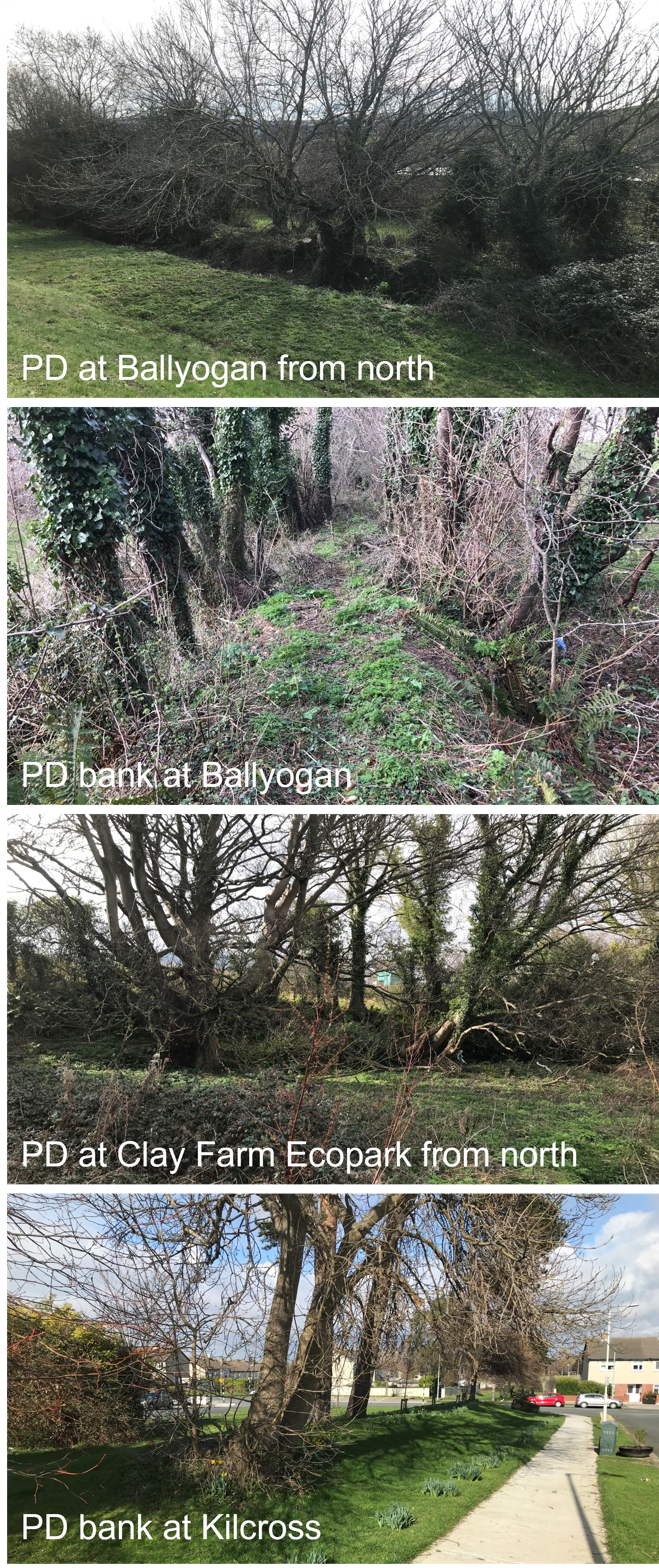
The Pale Ditch in South Dublin

Portions of the Pale ditch can still be seen in the Sandyford/Kilgobbin/Ballyogan areas of South Dublin. The best-preserved section can be visited and lies just south of the Ballyogan Road within the Ballyogan Recycling Park. It consists of pair of ditches on either side of a high flat-topped bank. The bank is 2 to 3 meters wide on the top and is approximately 2 meters above the bottom of the ditches. The entire length of this section is roughly 500 meters and the top of the bank is planted with hedgerow shrubs, indicating that the Pale ditch subsequently served as a field boundary.

Another section of the Pale ditch lies in the Clay Farm Ecopark, near the Ballyogan Road. This section is very different from the previous section, in that it does not consist of a double ditch and bank. Rather, the builders made use of an existing shallow escarpment, steepening the slope to create a 2 meter high barrier to movement from north to south. The purpose of this was probably to make it hard for Irish raiders to herd stolen cattle from the English Pale to the Wicklow mountains to the south. That this feature was part of the Pale ditch was originally proposed by Rob Goodbody in the 1990s, and recently confirmed by archaeology during the building of the Clay Farm housing development.

Both the sections described above are part of a single linear earthwork, designed to connect Kilgobbin and Carrickmines castles, fortifications built by the Walsh Family during the medieval period to defend the southern marches of the Pale. Another, slightly less well-preserved section of the Pale ditch can be seen at Kilcross Crescent within the Kilcross housing estate near Sandyford village. This section consists of a bank approximately 200 metres long, although the associated ditches are no longer clearly visible.

=== Potential section at Kiltalown ===
In 1996, a linear earthwork running along the southern boundary of Kiltalown House near Jobstown in Tallaght was noted by the National Monuments Service as resembling that of the Pale ditch as found elsewhere. A survey and small-scale excavation of the tree-lined earthwork was carried out in March 1998, but found that establishing the archaeological significance of the earthwork was difficult, considering how similarly a potential section of the Pale ditch resembles an earthwork typical of a medieval enclosure. As excavations.ie notes:

The Kiltalown earthwork belongs to the late medieval tradition of protective enclosure that reaches its apogee in the attempted enclosure of the Pale in 1494–5, and the identification of it as part of the Pale is a reasonable one, but it may equally have enclosed an area of medieval parkland.

== End ==
The idea of the Pale was inseparable from the notion of a separate Anglo-Irish polity and culture. After the 17th century, and especially after the Anglican Reformation and the Plantation of Ulster, the "Old English" settlers were gradually assimilated into the Irish population. This was in large part due to their relative reluctance to give up Roman Catholicism (those who did not worship in the Church of Ireland bore a variety of legal disabilities). They kept their version of the English language, though by that time many of them also spoke Irish. Several of these men were notable contributors to literature in Irish, including Pierce Ferriter and Geoffrey Keating. Christopher Nugent, 6th Baron Delvin, wrote an Irish-language primer for Elizabeth I.

== See also ==
- Greater Dublin Area
- History of Ireland
- Kingdom of Dublin
- Pale of Settlement in Imperial Russia
- Beyond the Pale
