= Gounaris =

Gounaris (Greek: Γούναρης) is a Greek surname. Notable people with the surname include:

- Dimitrios Gounaris (1867–1922), Greek politician and Prime Minister of Greece
- Ioannis Gounaris (born 1952), Greek footballer
- Nikos Gounaris (1915–1965), Greek singer
