= Catalogue of Icelandic Volcanoes =

Website about potentially active volcanoes in Iceland

- Native name: Íslensk eldfjallavefsjá
- Available in: 2 languages
- List of languages English, Icelandic
- Country of origin: Iceland
- Creators: Icelandic Meteorological Office, the Institute of Earth Sciences at the University of Iceland, and the Civil Protection Department of the National Commissioner of the Iceland Police
- Editors: Bergrún Arna Óladóttir, Guðrún Larsen, Magnús Tumi Guðmundsson, Evgenia Ilyinskaya
- Website: icelandicvolcanos.is
- Commercial: No
- Launched: 2015; 11 years ago
- Current status: live

The Catalogue of Icelandic Volcanoes (CIV) is a web resource that was created to serve as an official source of information about potentially active volcanoes monitored by Iceland. The creation of the website followed the disruptive 2010 eruptions of Eyjafjallajökull and allows access to a database of recent eruptions and their details. The website's design was subsequently used in creating the website European Catalogue of Volcanoes that covers a larger area, and which has much, but not all the functionality of the Catalogue of Icelandic Volcanoes.

== Current Status ==
The website displays information on 32 Icelandic volcanic systems in English or Icelandic. It also provides information on the Beerenberg volcano.

== History ==
Volcano observatory functionality in Iceland was prior to the air travel disruption after the 2010 Eyjafjallajökull eruption partially joint funded by the International Civil Aviation Organization (ICAO) The initial June 2010 meeting of the International Volcanic Ash Task Force (IVATF), created by the ICAO after the eruption, had a working paper on improvement of volcanic monitoring and advice presented by the World Organization of Volcano Observatories that recommended increased support for the volcano observatories of the world. Seed funding originally came from the International Civil Aviation Organization (ICAO) in 2010, for what was projected as a 3-year project to collate relevant knowledge and create a comprehensive catalogue readily available to decision makers, stakeholders and the general public. In September 2011 this project analysing and categorising volcanic activity in Iceland was noted to be beneficial for the larger long term risk assessment project funded by the Icelandic government. Later funding also came from the European Commission with the FUTUREVOLC project.

By 2012 the task mainly financed by the ICAO, to improve the knowledge and behaviour information in the then catalogue of Icelandic volcanoes supplemented by information about ash particle grain-size distribution was reported to be underway.

Prepublication extracts of the new catalogue were being used by 2014.

The web site was showcased in April 2015 to praise and a beta version launched later that year with data on Bárðarbunga, Grímsvötn, Hekla and Katla.

The website was launched formally internationally in 2016, and is official. The Global Volcanism Program website recognises it as an additional web resource.

In 2019 the Icelandic version of the website was launched.

By November 2020 the almost identically formatted Catalogue of European Volcanoes website went live, initially with information on active volcanoes or volcanic areas monitored by France, Greece, Italy, Portugal and Spain as well as Iceland.

In 2024 the two websites were recognised in a peer-reviewed academic paper on tephra dispersion as important resources for modelling this. As of 2024, of the two similar websites, only the Catalogue of Icelandic Volcanoes has an additional data portal functionality.
