= Pál =

- Gender: masculine
- Language: Hungarian
- Name day: January 25, June 26, 29, 30

Other gender
- Feminine: Paula, Paulina

Origin
- Language: Latin
- Meaning: "small" or "humble"

Other names
- Nicknames: Pali, Palkó
- Cognate: Paulus
- Anglicisation: Paul

Pál is a Hungarian masculine given name, the Hungarian version of Paul. It may refer to:

- Pál Almásy (1818–1882), Hungarian lawyer and politician
- Pál Bedák (born 1985), Hungarian boxer
- Pál Benkő (1928–2019), Hungarian-American chess player
- Pál Csernai (1932–2013), Hungarian football player and manager
- Pál Dárdai (footballer, born 1951) (died 2017), Hungarian football player and manager
- Pál Dárdai (born 1976), Hungarian football coach and retired player
- Pál Palkó Dárdai (born 1999), German-Hungarian footballer, son of the above
- Pál Dunay (1909–1993), Hungarian fencer
- Paul Erdős (1913–1996), Hungarian mathematician
- Paul I, Prince Esterházy (Pál Eszterházy) (1635–1713), first Prince Esterházy of Galántha
- Paul II Anton, Prince Esterházy (Pál Antal Eszterházy) (1711–1762), Hungarian prince
- Paul III Anton, Prince Esterházy (Pál Antal Eszterházy) (1786–1866), Hungarian prince
- Pál Gábor (1932–1987), Hungarian film director and screenwriter
- Pál Gerevich (born 1948), Hungarian fencer
- Pál Jávor (actor) (1902–1959), Hungarian actor, and the country's first male movie star
- Pál Joensen (born 1990), Faroese swimmer
- Pál Kinizsi (1432–1494), Hungarian general in the service of the Hungarian King Matthias Corvinus
- Pál Kitaibel (1757–1817), Hungarian botanist and chemist
- Pál Koppán (1878–1951), Hungarian track and field athlete
- Pál Kovács (1912–1995), Hungarian athlete
- Pál Losonczi (1919–2005), Hungarian communist politician
- Pál Maléter (1917–1958), Hungarian military leader of the 1956 Hungarian Revolution
- Pal Molnar (born 1952), Hungarian journalist
- Pál Rosty de Barkócz (1830–1874), Hungarian nobleman, photographer and explorer
- Pál Sajgó (1922–2016), Hungarian cross country skier and biathlete
- Pál Schmitt (born 1942), Hungarian Olympic fencer and politician, President of Hungary from 2010 to 2012
- Pál Szécsi (1944–1974), Hungarian pop singer
- Pál Teleki (1879–1941), Hungarian politician who served as prime minister of the Kingdom of Hungary from 1920 to 1921 and from 1939 to 1941
- Pál Teleki (footballer) (1906–1985), Hungarian footballer
- Pál Titkos (1908–1988), Hungarian footballer
- Pál Tomori (c. 1475–1526), Catholic monk, archbishop of Kalocsa, Hungary, and commander of the Hungarian army at the Battle of Mohács
- Pál Turán (1910–1976), also known as Paul Turán, Hungarian mathematician
- Pál Várhidi (1931–2015), Hungarian football player and manager
- Pál Völner (born 1962), Hungarian jurist and politician
- Pál Wágner (born 1935), Hungarian rower

== See also ==
- Pal (given name)
