= Pal Homonai =

Pal Homonai Пал Хомонај
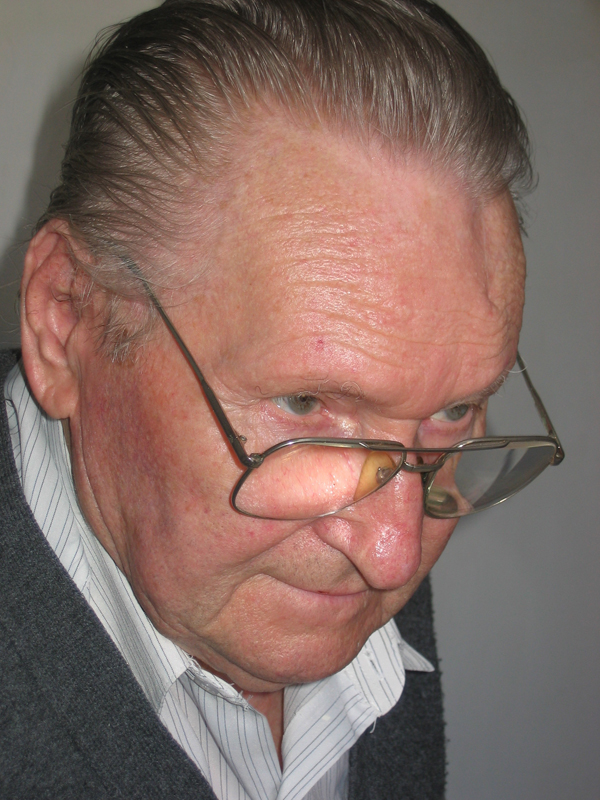
- Pal Homonai
- Born: Pal Homonai; May 28, 1922; Irig, Serbia; Yugoslavia
- Died: December 6, 2010 (aged 88); Kecskemét, Hungary
- Known for: Painter
- Movement: Naïve art

Pal Homonai (Serbian Cyrillic: Пал Хомонај; Irig, 28 May 1922 – Kecskemét, June, 12th 2010), was a Serbian-Hungarian Naïve art painter.

== Biography ==
Homonai was born to a peasant family in Irig on 28 May 1922. He spent his childhood on pastures of the villages in Srem, which was to become the primary source of his inspiration. He mastered the carpentry in 1938 and moved to Novi Sad, where he practiced various forms of the craft, intarsia, etc. He began doing painting in 1964. His first independent exhibition at Đuro Salaj Gallery in Belgrade in 1968, was, among others, visited by Oto Bihalji-Merin and Bolumil Karlavaris who wrote first commendable reviews. He lived and worked in Novi Sad until 1992, when he moved to Kecskemét where he stayed until his death on 6 December 2010.

== Artistic style and work ==
He portrays rural subjects, but also the facades of old town buildings. With his original painting style, he creates stylized compositions of pastures, wheat fields, country fairs, harvests and weddings in various seasons. Like someone observing the distance from the cliff of his artistic mind, he creates a panoramic view. There is a lot of free space in his paintings where life events are often synthesized like miniatures. By shifting from hills to planes, from striped to dotty furrows, from human to animal figures, he stresses the sound and rhythm of his compositions.

== Exhibitions and awards ==
His paintings are on permanent display of galleries and museums worldwide. Great and representative collections of his works are in Museum of Naïve and Marginal Art (MNMA), Jagodina, Serbia. He was many times awarded for his work. At the Eleventh International Biennial of Naïve and Marginal Art, of MNMA, Jagodina, 2003, he received the Award for Entire Artistic Work.

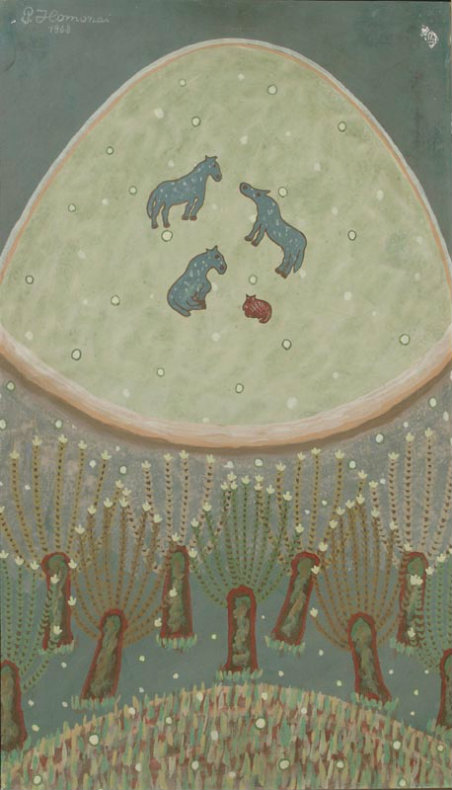
Horses on Pastures, 1968
tempera on hardboard, 70x40cm
MNMA, Jagodina

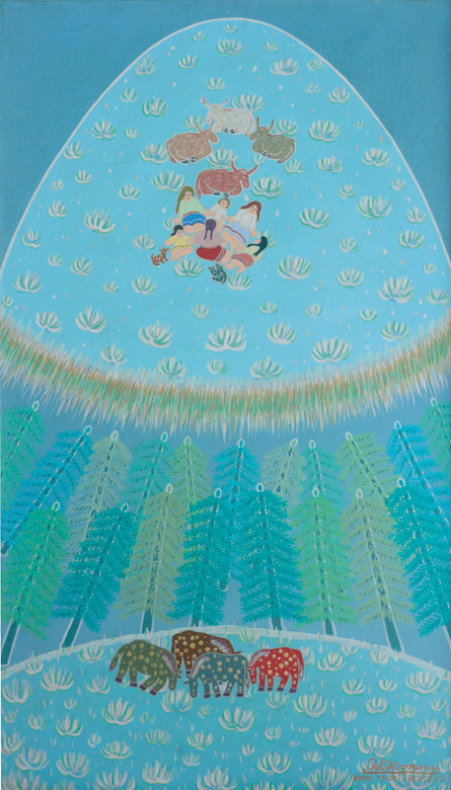
Horses, Oxen and Girls, n. a.
tempera on canvas, 70x40cm
MNMA, Jagodina

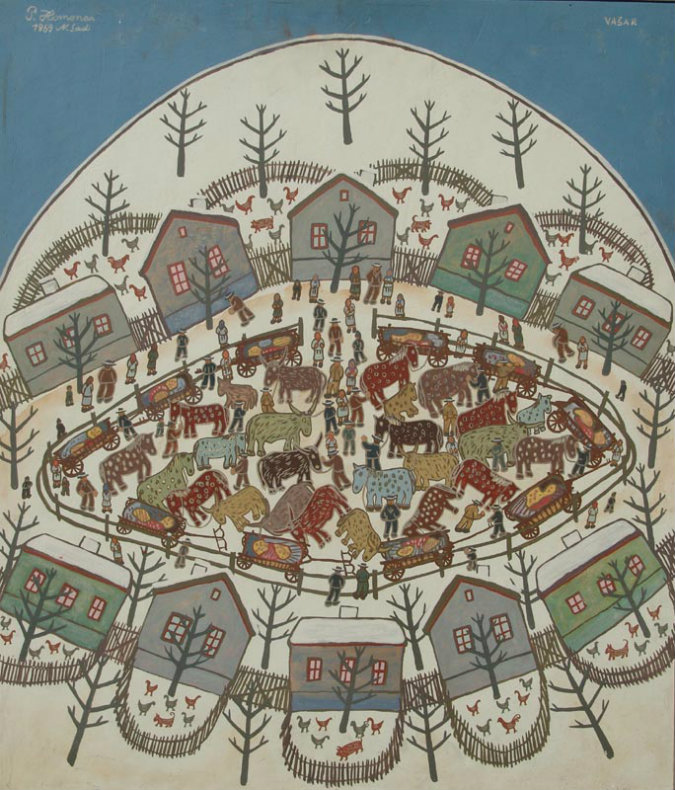
Fair, 1969
tempera on hardboard, 70x50cm
MNMA, Jagodina

== Literature ==
- М. Бошковић; М. Маширевић,Самоуки ликовни уметници у Србији,Торино, 1977
- Oto Bihalji-Merin; Небојша Бато Томашевић, Енциклопедија наивне уметности света, Београд, 1984
- Н. Крстић, Наивна уметност Србије, САНУ, МНМУ, Јагодина, 2003
- Н. Крстић, Наивна и маргинална уметност Србије, МНМУ, Јагодина, 2007
- Ивана Јовановић, Пал Хомонаи, МНМУ, Јагодина, 2007
