= 30 Pall Mall =

General information
- Status: Never built
- Location: Pall Mall, Liverpool, England, United Kingdom

Height
- Antenna spire: 72 metres (236 ft)

Technical details
- Floor count: 18

Design and construction
- Architect: Broadway Malyan

30 Pall Mall was a design for an office building approved for construction in the commercial district of Liverpool, England in 2009. It was never built.

== Details ==
30 Pall Mall was to have office space of 22,110 m^{2} (238,000 sq ft) and stand 18 storeys tall, becoming one of the tallest buildings in Liverpool upon completion. The building was designed by Broadway Malyan.

The building was to consist of two separate buildings, one of eight storeys, the other of nine, with an 18-storey tower in the centre. Although it was dubbed by its designer as the 'city centre's biggest ever single commercial office development', 30 Pall Mall was also going to be occupied by several retail units and restaurants on its ground floor. The design was praised for its sustainable approach and environmentally friendly features, although met criticism largely based upon its size that was seen by some as unnecessary on a street such as Pall Mall which is primarily home to relatively short Victorian buildings. Planning permission was granted in 2009; construction was set to begin on the currently derelict site sometime in 2010. Planning permission expired in 2012 but was sought once more and granted for a second time; this second approval expired in January 2016 and construction never began.

In September 2016, a brand new scheme was revealed for the site, this time by developers Anwyl Construction and architects Falconer Chester Hall, for a 22-storey residential tower; approval was granted in 2017.

== See also ==
- List of tallest buildings and structures in Liverpool
