= Kalogeropoulos =

Kalogeropoulos (Greek: Καλογερόπουλος) is a Greek surname, which means son of a monk. The female version of the name is Kalogeropoulou (Καλογεροπούλου). Notable people with the surname include:

== Men ==
- Nikolaos Kalogeropoulos (1851–1927), Prime Minister of Greece

== Women ==
- Maria Anna Sofia Cecilia Kalogeropoulou, birth name of (Maria Callas), Greek operatic soprano
- Xenia Kalogeropoulou, Greek actress
