= Beyond the Pale =

Beyond the pale is a figure of speech that means "behaviour beyond the boundary of acceptability."

It may also refer to:

== Literature ==
- "Beyond the Pale", a short story by Rudyard Kipling, collected in the 1888 collection Plain Tales from the Hills
- Beyond the Pale, a 1981 short story collection by Irish author William Trevor
- Beyond the Pale, a 1997 novel by American author Elana Dykewomon
- Beyond the Pale (book), a 1998 novel in the Last Rune series by Mark Anthony
- Beyond the Pale Publications, a company in Northern Ireland

== Music ==
- Beyond the Pale (band), a Canadian klezmer and folk music band
- Beyond the Pale (Brave Old World album), 1994
- Beyond the Pale (Fiona album), 1986
- Beyond the Pale (Jarv Is album), 2020
- Beyond the Pale, an album by The Dark Poets, 2008
- Beyond the Pale, an album by X-Fusion, 2004
- "Beyond the Pale", a song by AD from the 1984 album Time Line
- "Beyond the Pale", a song by Big Audio Dynamite from the 1986 album No. 10, Upping St.
- "Beyond the Pale", a song by Exodus from the 2010 album Exhibit B: The Human Condition
- "Beyond the Pale", a song by Imminence from the 2024 album The Black
- "Beyond the Pale", a song by In Vain from the 2024 album Solemn
- "Beyond the Pale", a song by Machine Head from the 2018 album Catharsis
- "Beyond the Pale" (song), a song by The Mission from the 1988 album Children
- "Beyond the Pale", a song by Mudvayne from the 2009 eponymous album
- "Beyond the Pale", a song by Pain of Salvation from the 2002 album Remedy Lane
- "Beyond the Pale", a song by Procol Harum from the 1974 album Exotic Birds and Fruit

== Other uses ==
- Beyond the Pale (1989 film), a British television film by William Trevor in the anthology series ScreenPlay
- Beyond the Pale (radio program), a radio program about Jewish culture and politics
- Beyond the Pale (film), a 1999 film directed by George Bazala
- Beyond the Pale (Jim Gaffigan album), a 2006 comedy album
- Beyond the Pale (Mutant Chronicles), a 1997 role-playing game adventure for Mutant Chronicles

== See also ==
- Tales From Beyond the Pale, a horror podcast
