= Pale, Dahanu =

Village in Maharashtra

Pale
- village
- Location in Maharashtra, India Pale (India)
- Coordinates: 19.929027°N 72.7717775°E
- Country: India
- State: Maharashtra
- District: Palghar
- Taluka: Dahanu
- Elevation: 12 m (39 ft)

Population (2011)
  - Total: 2,569
- Time zone: UTC+5:30 (IST)
- 2011 census code: 551615

Pale is a village in the Palghar district of Maharashtra, India. It is located in the Dahanu taluka.

== Demographics ==
According to the 2011 census of India, Pale has 523 households. The effective literacy rate (i.e. the literacy rate of population excluding children aged 6 and below) is 58.84%.

Demographics (2011 Census)
	Total	Male	Female
Population	2569	1240	1329
Children aged below 6 years	351	163	188
Scheduled caste	0	0	0
Scheduled tribe	959	465	494
Literates	1305	778	527
Workers (all)	1028	666	362
Main workers (total)	868	612	256
Main workers: Cultivators	70	54	16
Main workers: Agricultural labourers	204	126	78
Main workers: Household industry workers	11	7	4
Main workers: Other	583	425	158
Marginal workers (total)	160	54	106
Marginal workers: Cultivators	38	14	24
Marginal workers: Agricultural labourers	59	20	39
Marginal workers: Household industry workers	0	0	0
Marginal workers: Others	63	20	43
Non-workers	1541	574	967
