= Pal, Gujarat =

Human settlement in Gujarat, India

Pal is a town and former princely state in Gujarat, western India.

== History ==
Pal was a Fifth Class princely state, comprising four more villages, covering 22 square miles in Halar prant of Western Kathiawar.

It had a combined population of 1,359 in 1901, yielding a state revenue of 17,836 Rupees (1903–04, over half from land), paying a tribute of 1,647 Rupees to the British and Junagarh State.

Ruler starts – Prithviraj Singh
