= Pail =

Pail may refer to:

- Bucket with an open top and a handle
- Pail (container) with a top and a handle
- PAIL (acronym) Pregnancy and Infant Loss
- Pail (unit)
