= Páll Melsteð (amtmann) =

Icelandic official and politician

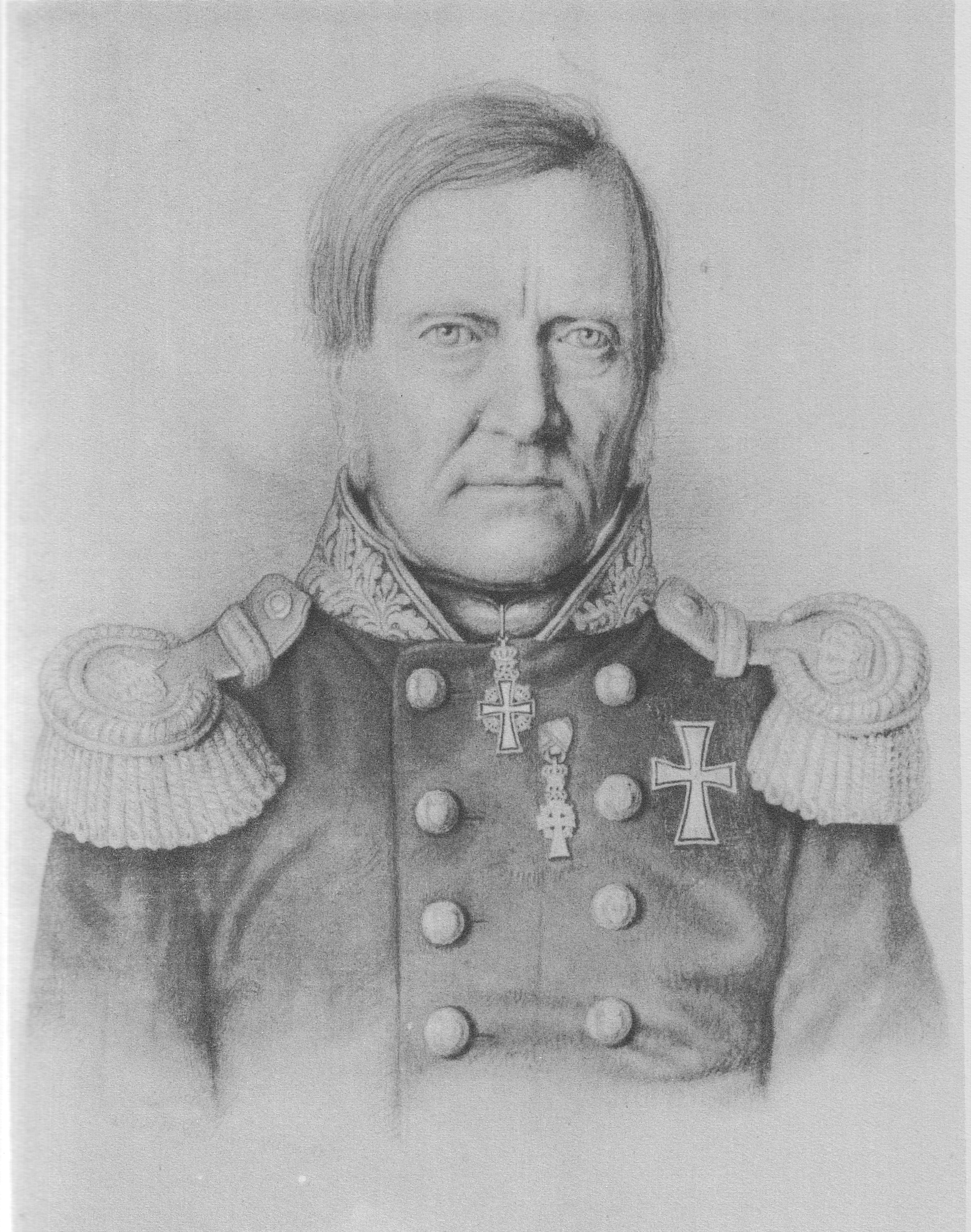
An 1858 portrait of Páll Melsteð by Sigurður málari.

Páll Melsteð (31 March 1791 – 9 May 1861) was an Icelandic official and politician.

He graduated from Bessastaðir School in 1809 and from Copenhagen University with a degree in law in 1815. From 1815 to 1849 he served as a sýslumaður in various sýslur. In 1849 he became the amtmann of the Western Amt, an office he retained until his death. He was a member of the Althing by royal appointment from 1847 until his death. He was also appointed by the king to the National Assembly of 1851.

He was the father of Páll Melsteð the historian.
