= Pall (name) =

Pall is a surname, and it can also be a given name. Notable people with the name include:

== Surname ==
- Alex Pall (born 1985), American musician, member of The Chainsmokers
- Ameet Pall (born 1987), Canadian football defensive end
- David Pall (1914–2004), American chemist, founder of Pall Corporation
- Donn Pall (born 1962), American baseball pitcher
- Gloria Pall (1927–2012), American model, showgirl, film and television actress, author and businesswoman
- Lisi Pall (born 1951), Austrian alpine skier
- Olga Pall (born 1947), Austrian alpine skier
- Valdek Pall (1927–2013), Estonian linguist

== Given name ==
- Pall Jenkins, American vocalist, guitarist and music producer

== See also ==
- Paul (name)
