= Dushmani family =

Noble family from Albania

Dushmani Dushmanët
- Noble family
- Coat of arms of the Dusmani as depicted in Rangabè's Livre d'Or De La Noblesse Ionienne (Corfou)
- Country: Medieval Albania
- Current region: Polati Minor
- Founded: 14th century
- Members: Pal Dushmani; Lekë Dushmani; Irene Dushmani

The Dushmani were an Albanian noble family that ruled parts of Pult, a historical province within the territory of the eponymous Dushmani tribe from the Dukagjin highlands in northern Albania, during 15th century rule under the Republic of Venice.

The name of the Dushmani family and the tribe from which they came is probably the oldest name of an Albanian tribe to be attested historically. Rendered in the form Dousmanes by Procopius, it was the name of one of the Illyrian-Thracian forts rebuilt by Justinian in the 6th century AD. Its similarity to the name Dussus may suggest that it was formed like many other names found among Albanians as a composition of two names, Dush (Dussus) and Mani. An ultimate link to Turkish düşman which made its way into Balkan languages after the Middle Ages is not plausible.

The oldest generation of the family is mentioned on 2 June 1403 when the Venetian Senate confirmed the three brothers Goranin, Damjan and Nenad the rule over their lands in Pilot Minor ("Little" or "Lower" Pilot) as Venetian subjects. Through various ways, the Republic of Venice won over local nobility in the Scutari region and thereby created a certain security zone around their possessions against the Ottomans. In July 1404 the brothers requested from the government that their litigations be addressed to the knez in Scutari.

In 1427, a "Dusmanus" is mentioned as the bishop of Polatum (Dusmanus ep. Polat.); Daniele Farlati (1690–1773) called him "Dussus" and put his office in 1427–46.

Pal Dushmani (d. 1457) was a Catholic bishop active in Shas (1443), Drisht (1446), and Krajë (1454).

Lekë Dushmani), was mentioned as one of the founders of the League of Lezhë. Lekë Dushmani held Zadrima. Lekë's daughter Irene (Jerina) became famous while there was a dispute for her which brought the first defection among the members of League of Lezhë which led toward the Albanian–Venetian War (1447–48). The Dushmani and Spani family did not participate in the war.

In Drisht, Dushmani’s gathered Venetian opponents, and partnering up with Lekë Dukagjini readied for rebellion in the city and among the villages. They planned to attack Venetian-controlled Drisht, but the plot was discovered, and in March 1451 the Council of Forty had Dushmani convicted to 30 years of exile from Venetian holdings in Albania. It was threatened that his head would be cut off between two pillars at the Doge's palace if anybody found him there.

In July 1452, Pope Nicholas V sent Pal Dushmani to settle the conflict between Lekë Dukagjini and Skanderbeg.

According to Demetrios Sicilianos, the Dousmanis family in Greece ultimately descended from the 15th-century Albanian nobleman "Lekas (Alexander) Dousmanis", whose family took refuge in Greece after the Ottoman conquest of Albania by Mehmed the Conqueror (r. 1444–81).

== Sources ==
- Antonović, Miloš (2003). Town and District in Littoral of Zeta and Northern Albania in XIVth and XVth Century. Istorijski institut. ISBN 978-86-7743-031-3.
- Božić, Ivan (1979). "О Дукађинима". Немирно Поморје XV века. Srpska književna zadruga. OCLC 5845972.
- Ljubić, Simeon (1875). Listine o odnošajih izmedju južnoga slavenstva i Mletačke Republike: Od godine 1403 do 1409. Jugoslavenska akademija znanosti i umjetnosti.
- Malović-Đukić, Marica (1991). "Пилот у средњем веку". Становништво словенског поријекла у Албанији: Зборник радова са међународног научног скупа одржаног на Цетињу 21, 22. и 23. јуна 1990. године. Titograd: Историјски институт СР Црне Горе. OCLC 29549273.
- Noli, Fan S. (1947). George Castrioti Scanderbeg (1405–1468). International Universities Press. OCLC 732882.
- Redakcija za istoriju Crne Gore (1970b). Историја Црне Горе (2): Црна Гора у доба обласних господара. Titograd: Redakcija za istoriju Crne Gore. OCLC 492555897.
- Schmitt, Oliver Jens (2001). Das venezianische Albanien (1392–1479) (in German). München: R. Oldenbourg Verlag GmbH München. ISBN 3-486-56569-9.
