= Thora Melsted =

Icelandic educator

Þóra Melsteð

Thora Melsted (1823 – 1919) was an Icelandic educator. She was a pioneer in the education of women in Iceland.

She was born in Denmark to the Icelandic official Grímur Jónsson (1785-1849) and the Dane Birgitte Cecile Breum (1792–1853). She was raised in Iceland but lived in Denmark in 1833–1846, where she was given a good education. In 1851–53, she managed a small school for girls in Reykjavík, which was the first school for girls in Iceland. In 1859 she married the Icelandic historian and politician Páll Melsteð.

She was active in the struggle to establish a permanent school for girls in Iceland. She organized a campaign and collected money for the purpose. In 1874, she achieved her ambition with the establishment of the Kvennaskólinn í Reykjavík (whose first principal she became), and was followed by the establishment by other schools for girls around Iceland. She was the principal of the school in 1874–1902.
