= Páll Ólafsson (poet) =

Icelandic poet

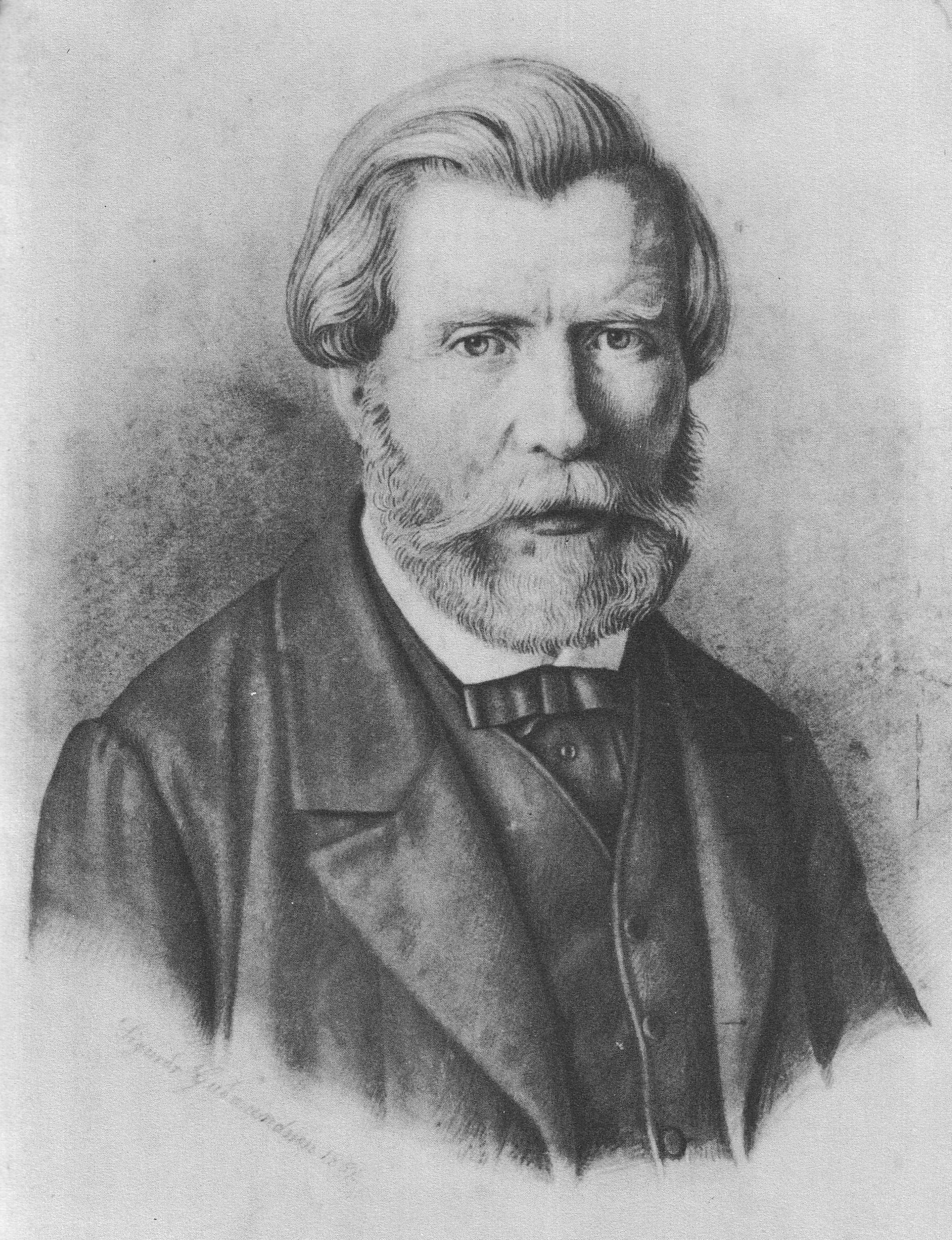
Drawing by Sigurður málari.

Páll Ólafsson (1827–1905) was an Icelandic poet and one of the most popular poets of the nation of the 19th century, known for poems about love and about horses.

Many of his poems were made into popular song, such as Lóan er komin and Ó blessuð vertu sumarsól.

== Bibliography ==
=== Poetry ===
Collections

- Ljóðmæli I-II. 1899–1900.
- Ljóðmæli. 1944.
- Ljóð. 1955.
- Ljóðmæli II. Reykjavík 1955.
- Fundin ljóð. Reykjavík 1971.
- Eg skal kveða um eina þig alla mína daga. Salka, bókaútgáfa 2008.

List of poems

Title	Year	First published	Reprinted/collected
Hríslan og laekurinn = The love of the birch tree and the stream	2003	Olafsson, Pall (Jul–Aug 2003). "Hríslan og laekurinn = The love of the birch tree and the stream". Quadrant. 47 (7–8 [398]). Translated by Alan Gould: 32.	
Komdu langan veg = Come the long distance home	2003	Olafsson, Pall (Jul–Aug 2003). "Komdu langan veg = Come the long distance home". Quadrant. 47 (7–8 [398]). Translated by Alan Gould: 32.	
Saell var ég thá = So joyous I was	2003	Olafsson, Pall (Jul–Aug 2003). "Saell var ég thá = So joyous I was". Quadrant. 47 (7–8 [398]). Translated by Alan Gould: 33.	
