= Páll Ólafsson (handballer) =

Icelandic handball player

Bjarki Sigurðsson
Personal information
- Nationality: Icelandic
- Born: 16 November 1967 (age 58) Iceland
- Height: 194 cm (76 in)

Sport
- Sport: Handball
- Position: Playmaker

Youth career
- Years: Team
- Þróttur Reykjavík: -1979

Senior clubs
- Years: Team
- 1979-1985: Þróttur Reykjavík
- 1985-1986: TSV Grün-Weiß Dankersen
- 1986: Fram Reykjavík
- 1986-1988: HSG TuRU Düsseldorf
- 1988-1991: KR Reykjavík
- 1991-1995: Haukar Hafnarfjörður
National team
Years	Team	Apps	(Gls)
–	Iceland Handball	174	(418)
–	Iceland Football	2	

Teams managed
- 2000-2001: HK Kópavogur
- 2001-2007: Haukar Hafnarfjörður

Páll Ólafsson (born 1 May 1960) is an Icelandic former handball player and handball coach. He competed in the 1988 Summer Olympics. Before concentrating on handball, Páll had a promising football career; a midfielder, he was capped twice for the Iceland national football team and played for Þróttur Reykjavík.

After his playing career he became the coach of HK Kópavogur, first as a co-coach and later on his own.
