= Pal Dushmani =

Pal Dushmani (Italian: Paolo Dusso, Albanian: Pal Dushmani; fl. 1440–died 1457) was a Roman Catholic hierarch active in Venetian territories on the Eastern Adriatic (Montenegro and Albania).

== Life ==
The Dushmani were an Albanian family in Pilot (now the Dukagjin highlands in northern Albania). The oldest generation of the family is mentioned on 2 June 1403 when the Venetian Senate confirmed Goranin, Damjan and Nenad the rule over Pilot Minor (as Venetian subjects). A "Dusmanus" (or Dussus) was the bishop of Pilot in 1427.

In 1440 he served as pastor in Treviso (in Italy), in 1443 as bishop of Svač (in Montenegro), and in 1446 as bishop of Drivasto (in Albania), and in 1454 as bishop of Craina (Skadarska Krajina). In July 1452 Pope Nicholas V sent him to settle the conflict between Lekë Dukagjini and Skanderbeg.

His predecessor at the newly founded archbishopric of Craina, Uniate prelate of Greek origin Sabbas, was seated at the Prečista Krajinska since 1452, and holding on to Eastern Rite psychologically readied the people (Serbian Orthodox) to accept Catholicism. In 1454, when the Franciscans complained about persecution from Đurađ Branković, Pal became the Papal Nunciate in Serbia and Albania with the rights to preach for war against the Ottomans. In order to lend Dushmani freer hand, the Pope excluded Drivasto from the jurisdiction of the Archbishop of Antivari, which led to bitter resistance from the latter. Dushmani's adaptive tactics in an Orthodox environment were presented to the Pope as betrayal of Catholicism: according to accusations, Dushmani claimed that the Orthodox Church was the right one and that it should be regarded higher than the Roman Church, allegedly prohibited that requests against his procedures be submitted to the Roman curia, and he himself acted as a Pope. In 1457, an investigation was ordered against him, but he died the same year, before it was started. In his place as bishop came John from Crete, another Uniate Greek.

== Sources ==
- Antonović, Miloš (2003). Town and District in Littoral of Zeta and Northern Albania in XIVth and XVth Century. Istorijski institut. ISBN 978-86-7743-031-3.
- Ljubić, Simeon (1875). Listine o odnošajih izmedju južnoga slavenstva i Mletačke Republike: Od godine 1403 do 1409. Jugoslavenska akademija znanosti i umjetnosti.
- Redakcija za istoriju Crne Gore (1970b). Историја Црне Горе (2): Црна Гора у доба обласних господара. Titograd: Redakcija za istoriju Crne Gore. OCLC 492555897.
