= Páll Melsteð (historian) =

Icelandic historian, official and editor

Páll Melsteð in 1876.

Páll Melsteð (13 November 1812 - 9 February 1910) was an Icelandic historian, official, editor and member of the Althing. In 1892 he was awarded the Order of the Dannebrog.

== Early life ==
Páll was the son of Páll Melsteð the official. At the age of 16 Páll entered the Learned School and graduated in 1834. He then went to study law at the University of Copenhagen but also studied history and the fine arts, especially singing. He returned to Iceland in 1840 when he married his first wife, Jórunn Ísleifsdóttir. They lived in Álftanes for several years where Páll started working on his first book, Ágrip af merkisatburðum mannkynssögunnar ["A Synopsis of the Significant Events of History"], which was printed in Viðey in 1844. He had also started work on a history of Iceland but in 1844 his house burnt down and his manuscripts were lost.

== Editor ==
Páll now moved to Reykjavík where he was the prime mover in founding Reykjavíkurpósturinn at a time when no newspaper was being published in Iceland. Páll had a role in editing the paper from 1846 through 1849. In 1848 he also played a role in founding Þjóðólfur. He also had a large role in the first years of Íslendingur (1860–1863) and was the editor of Víkverji in 1873 and 1874.

== Official ==
Þóra Melsteð

In 1848 and 1849 Páll was the sýslumaður (a kind of sheriff) of Árnessýsla but from 1849 to 1854 he was the sýslumaður of Snæfellsnessýsla. He was elected as a representative of Snæfellsnes to the National Assembly of 1851 and to the Althing in 1859. In 1855 Páll again went again to Copenhagen to study law since he had not completed a degree the first time. He graduated in Danish laws in 1857. From 1858 to 1862 Páll was sýslumaður for Gullbringu- og Kjósarsýsla. In 1858 Jórunn died and Páll married his second wife, Þóra Melsteð. They were to work together on establishing Kvennaskólinn, the first girls' school of Iceland.

== Historian ==
From 1862 to 1885 Páll worked as a lawyer in Reykjavík. In 1868 he started teaching part-time at the Learned School and in 1885 he became a full-time history professor. In the 1860s Páll wrote and published a multi-volume work on world history, Fornaldarsagan (1864), Miðaldarsagan (1866), Nýja sagan (1868). In 1891 his Norðurlandasaga ["History of the Nordic Countries"] was published. He also wrote a number of historical articles in various periodicals. Páll's historical writings were praised for their lively and lucid writing style but criticized for their heavy emphasis on warfare and giving short shrift to cultural history. Páll's memoirs, Endurminningar, were published posthumously in 1912.
