= History of Greece (1924–1941) =

History of Greece between the World Wars

The interwar period in Greece was a turbulent political period characterised by the alternation of monarchy and republic, successive military coups in favour of different political options, and the country's continuing economic weakness. Strictly, the country did not emerge from World War I until its defeat by the new Turkish republic in the 1919-1922 war and did not enter World War II until the Italian attack in October 1940.

Despite having parliamentary governments for most of the interwar period and only short periods of dictatorship (until Metaxas from 1936 onwards), the state of siege, which allowed governments to infringe civil rights, was common. The main feature of Greek politics at the time was not, however, the continuity of the parliamentary system, but the perpetuation of the ‘National Schism’ between supporters of Eleftherios Venizelos and those of successive monarchs, which had begun in 1915. The abolition of the monarchy and Venizelos' subsequent temporary withdrawal from politics in 1924 favoured the military's involvement in politics. The model of the state, contested between republicans and monarchists, was one of the main causes of the continuing political crisis. The military, also divided between republicans and monarchists, staged successive coups d'état (1925, 1926, 1933 and 1935) in favour of the republic until, in 1936, after the restoration of the monarchy, republican officers were expelled from the armed forces.

In economic terms, the interwar period was one of the most dynamic periods in the country's history, marked by industrial growth, economic development and the redistribution of wealth. Growth, however, was insufficient for the Greek peasantry and proletariat to achieve a good standard of living. Like other Balkan countries at the time, rapid population growth, low agricultural productivity, insufficient industrial growth to absorb the overpopulation of the countryside and a weak internal market kept them poor.

== Domestic policy ==
=== General features ===
Greek domestic politics in the interwar period, which for Greece properly began with the end of the war with Turkey in 1922-1923, was mainly characterised by the confrontation between two blocs, which emerged after 1909 and became entrenched during the First World War: they played a leading role in the so-called ‘national schism’: the Venizelist and the anti-Venizelist blocs, names derived from one of the leading politicians in Greek history in the first third of the 20th century, Eleftherios Venizelos. The supporters of the former were mainly republicans, like other minor left-wing groups such as the agrarians and the communists, while the latter were monarchists. The two groups were organised around a main party, which was accompanied by others, sometimes with a short-lived existence. That of the Venizelos group was the Liberal Party, founded and led by Venizelos himself and then, towards the end of the period, by Themistoklis Sophoulis. (Note: Some leaders left the party to form their own political formations: Alexandros Papanastasiou presided over the Republican Union or Agrarian-Labor Party, the left of the Venizelist group; Andreas Michalakópoulos occupied the other end of the spectrum at the head of his small group, the Liberal Conservatives or Republican Conservatives; and Georgios Kaphantaris headed the center-right Progressives. General Georgios Kondylis, at the head of the National Republicans or Radical Republicans, was the main leader of the Venizelist groups (although he later changed sides), mainly because of his prominent role in the extra-parliamentary politics of the time. (Mavrogordatos, 1983, p. 26)) That of the anti-Venizelist was the People's Party (sometimes called Populist Party), founded by Dimitrios Gounaris and later chaired by Panagis Tsaldaris, absorbed the structures of the old parties that had been swept away by Venizelos' accession to national politics in 1909. The Liberal Party was the political organisation par excellence of the bourgeoisie, made up of merchants, shipowners, small bankers and industrialists.

The war with Turkey also had a considerable influence on Greek politics at the time: it ended the fundamental importance of irredentism as the focus of foreign policy, radically changed the composition of the electoral roll due to the arrival of more than a million people, made the refugee problem the country's main internal problem, and facilitated the temporary end of the monarchy.

Political parties were generally clientelist and caudillista structures, which membership groups failed to eliminate. The two main parties were so, despite attempts, particularly in the case of the Liberal Party, to transform themselves into a modern mass party based on membership groups rather than patronage groups of local notables, which were thwarted by them. The caudillista and clientelist character of the political organisations was even more evident in the case of the minor parties, which were essentially made up of their founder, the notables who split with him from the parent party out of dissatisfaction, and their clientelist networks, mainly corresponding to their regions of origin. Clientelism was also more accentuated in the right-wing parties than in the left-wing ones —none in the case of the Communist party— in rural areas than in urban areas and in the territories of the old kingdom than in those annexed after 1912.

=== Defeat against Turkey and its consequences (1923-1925) ===
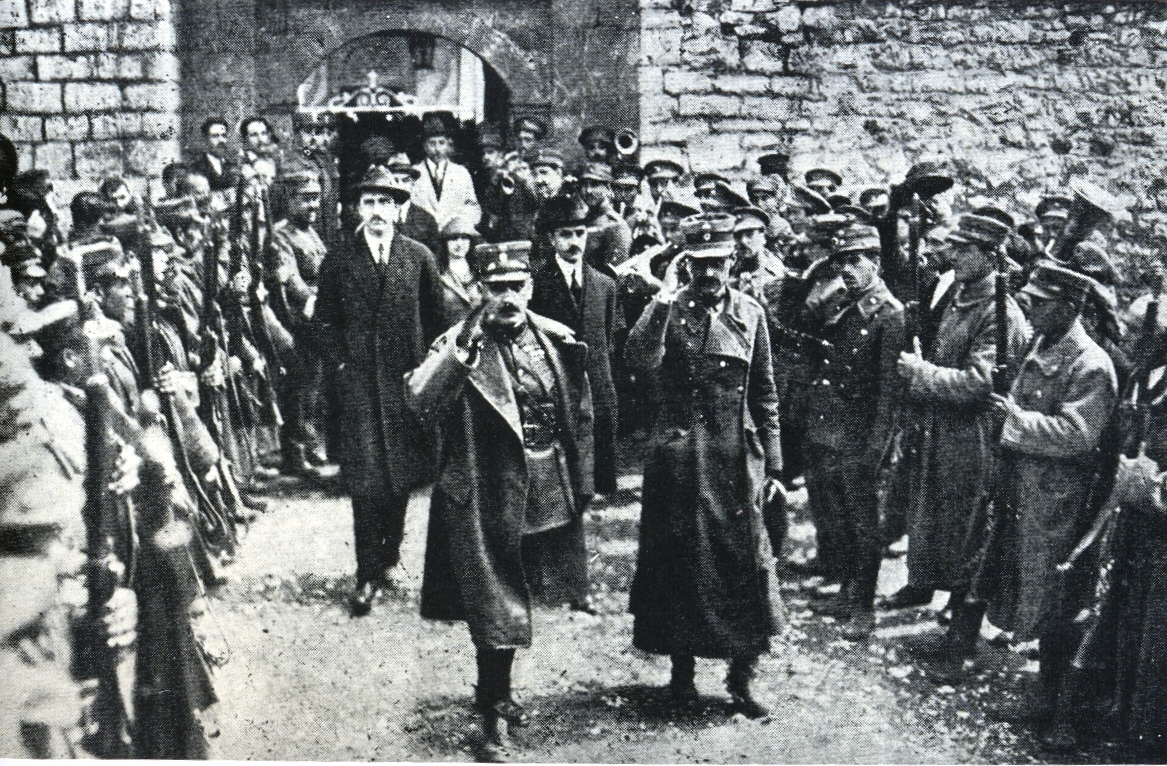
Colonels Stylianos Gonatas (centre) and Nikolaos Plastiras (right), leaders of the September 1922 coup that precipitated King Constantine I's final exile.

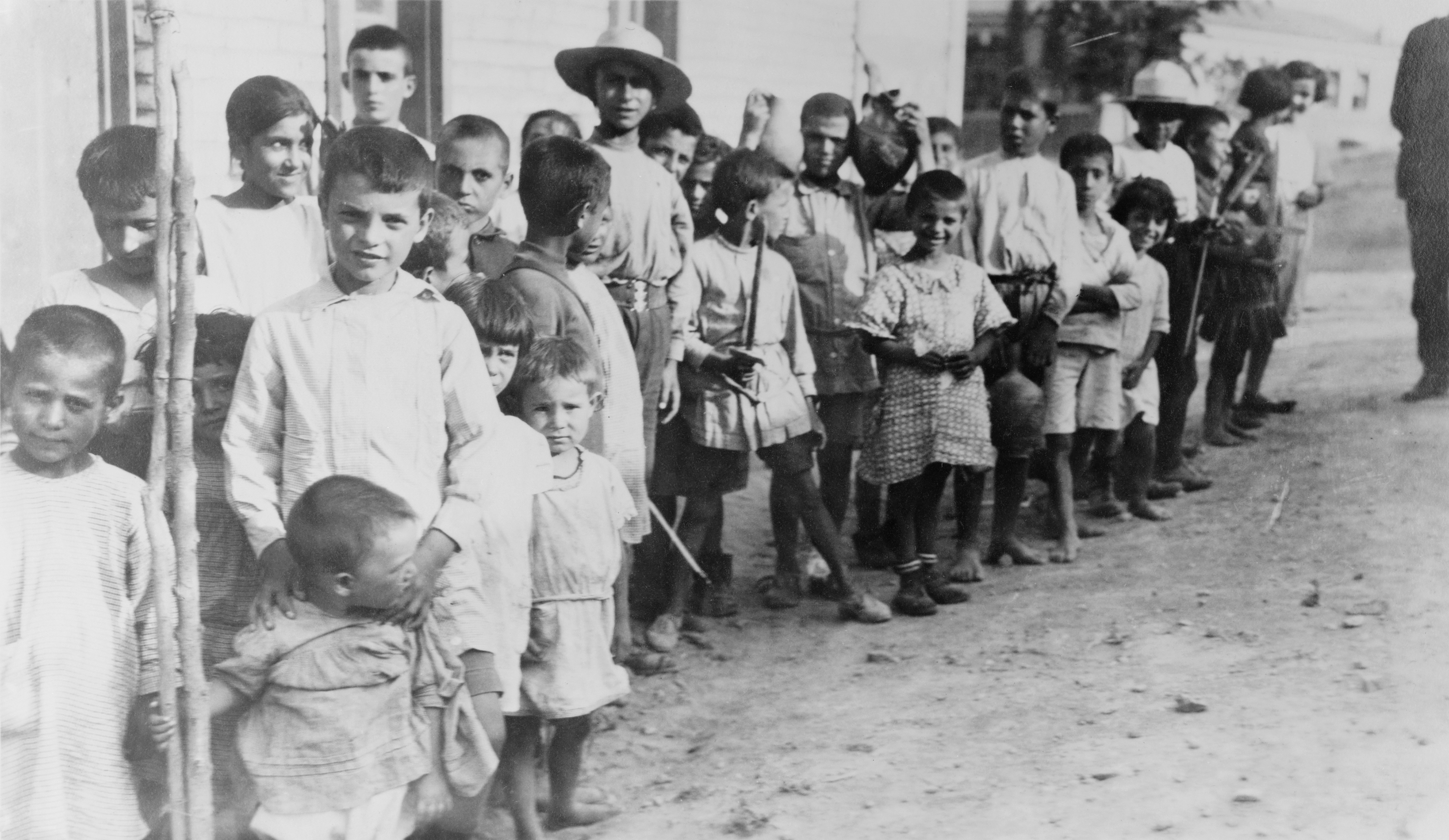
Greek and Armenian refugees in Athens, 1923. The settlement of the large number of refugees from Asia Minor after the defeat in the war with Turkey severely affected the post-war Greek economy and profoundly changed its social composition.

The interwar period in Greece began after a series of major changes, some of which extended into the 1920s: the decade of almost uninterrupted wars from 1912 to 1922, the large population exchange with Turkey that took place between 1919 and 1924, and the implementation of a major land reform between 1917 and 1927.

When Greece was defeated in the war against the new Turkish republic, a coup in 1922 overthrew the monarchical government that had led the last years of the campaign and established one of the briefest periods of non-parliamentary government in modern Greek history. It was led by Colonels Plastiras and Gonatas, who were supported by 20,000 troops who landed at Lavrio. The coup plotters presented the king with an ultimatum of 26 September, which he accepted before leaving the throne to his son George and going into exile. The coup, which was widely supported, gave way once again to a civilian government. Republican officers temporarily gained control of the army after the defeat in Asia Minor and executed six royalist ministers and military officers, (Note: On 28 November, six of the eight high-ranking political and military officials arrested after the military uprising, five ministers and the former commanding general Georgios Hatzianestis were shot. (Campbell, Sherrard, 1969, p. 127)) who were considered the main perpetrators of the defeat in November 1922. Those executed served primarily as scapegoats for the military failure, thereby exonerating the army as a whole for the defeat and assuaging the desire for revenge among soldiers and refugees, but also perpetuated the division that had emerged during the world war between supporters of the king and Venizelos. The new military government headed by Colonel Nikolaos Plastiras was initially intended to present itself as non-partisan, but the repression of anti-Venizelos supporters and the execution of ‘the six’ caused it to take a Venizelosist turn. The military coup had two main consequences: it divided the Venizelists into supporters and opponents of the republican system, and it emancipated the military from the civilian political leadership.

One of the first tasks of the military government was to negotiate peace with Turkey, which was finally signed at Lausanne on 24 July 1923, and to settle the refugees from Turkish territory. The Greek military defeat by Turkey led to a population exchange agreement between the two countries (January 30, 1923): some 1.4 million refugees (Note: 1.3 million according to Papacosma. (Papacosma, 1980. p. 3)) from Turkish territory were transferred to Greece, and some 350,000 Turks and Bulgarians left. The only exceptions were the Turkish population of Western Thrace and the Greek population of Constantinople. (Note: By the time the agreement was reached, about one million Greeks had fled or been expelled from Turkey and only about one hundred and fifty thousand more had to move to Greece. (Campbell, Sherrard, 1969, p. 129) Also, three hundred and eighty-eight thousand Turks were deported to Turkey. (Campbell, Sherrard, 1969, p. 129) Some one hundred thousand Greeks remained in Constantinople. (Campbell, Sherrard, 1969, p. 129) Greece and Bulgaria had already agreed in 1919 to a similar, if theoretically voluntary, population exchange in 1919, which resulted in fifty-three thousand people going to Bulgaria and thirty thousand to Greece. (Papacosma, p. 1980, p. 2) Some eighty thousand Slavs, officially considered ‘Slavic-speaking Greeks’ and unofficially Bulgarians, remained on Greek territory. (Papacosma, 1980, p. 3)) This made Greece one of the nation states with the lowest percentage of minorities —6 %— and concentrated almost the entire Greek-speaking population in the country. For Greece, then home to some five million people, the settlement and integration of refugees was a major problem that successive governments had to deal with. The exchange did, however, eliminate one of the pillars of Greece's previous foreign policy since independence in the 19th century, namely irredentism, which has since been reduced to the Greek minority in Albania, Cyprus and the Dodecanese, which is of secondary importance. The settlement of some 700,000 refugees in Macedonia, a region in dispute with Serbia (later Yugoslavia) and Bulgaria, ensured the Hellenisation of the territory: if the population of Greek culture had been approximately 43% of the total in 1913 compared to 39% of Muslims, by 1926 it was already 89%. The same was true of the important cosmopolitan city of Thessaloniki, which in 1912 had a majority Sephardic Jewish population.

The main threat to the military government of Plastiras, the ‘leader’ of the ‘revolution’, and Gonatas, the prime minister, were the officers who thought the overthrow of Constantine and the shooting of the political and military leaders of November 1922 were insufficient and who demanded the end of the monarchy, who banded together in a military league in July 1923. The league undermined discipline in the army and increased the political influence of some officers: Generals Theodoros Pangalos, Georgios Kondylis and Alexandros Othonaios and Admiral Alexandros Chatzykiriakos. This grouping of the republican military brought together their opponents.

Monarchist and liberal military officers opposed to the Republicans tried in vain to overthrow the Republican government of General Stylianos Gonatas in a failed coup d'état on 23 October 1923. The great purge of anti-Venizelist officers that followed the failed attempt —more than a thousand were expelled from the army— (Note: Half a thousand, according to Campbell and Sherrard (Campbell, Sherrard, 1969, p. 13).) and the fear that the anti-Venizelists would take revenge for the executions of November 1922 made the officers determined defenders of the republic. The failure also ended the hopes of Ioannis Metaxas' party, which until then had preoccupied his Venizellist opponents, for an electoral victory in the planned elections, and Metaxas himself fled the country. It also temporarily sealed the fate of the monarchy, which was abolished shortly afterwards.

Elections to the Constituent Assembly
(16/12/1923) seats
1. Independent Venizelists (7) (2.00%)
2. Liberal Party (250) (63.0%)
3. Republican Liberals and Republican Union (120) (30.0%)
4. Independent Republicans (7) (2.00%)
5. Agrarian Party (3) (1.00%)
6. Others (11) (3.00%)
(Mavrogordatos, 1983, p. 31)

The military government held elections at the end of 1923 (16 December), in which the ‘populists’ (royalists) did not participate and which resulted in a broadly republican Parliament divided among various currents of the ‘Venizelism’. The military forced King George II into exile two days after the December elections, despite the fact that the majority in Parliament was liberal-conservative and not particularly in favour of a republic. The military government handed over power to the Constituent Assembly elected in December 1923 in January the following year.

Venizelos had been victorious in the elections at the end of 1923, but he did not want the proclamation of a republic, but rather the maintenance of the constitutional monarchy. He returned to the country after the handover of power to the Constituent Assembly, but resigned after only nineteen days when he saw the attitude of Parliament in favour of the republic. He had been called to the country by both his opponents and his supporters in the hope that he could bridge the deep divisions between them. He did not succeed, nor did he succeed in preventing the disintegration of the liberals or in subjecting the military to civilian authority. His withdrawal in 1924 paved the way for military intervention in national politics through a series of coups d'état that reflected the often conflicting interests of the officers and led to great instability. (Note: There were six cabinets and an even greater number of coup attempts between January 1924 and June 1925 (Campbell, Sherrard, 1969, p. 13).) The first cabinet after Venizelos' resignation and re-exile, the one headed by Georgios Kafantaris, resigned precisely at the insistence of the military and the Liberal Party split into three formations (the Progressive Liberals of the resigned Kafantaris, the Conservative Liberals of Andreas Michalakopoulos and the group of Themistoklis Sofoulis).

The Republican military, who had purged the armed forces of their adversaries after the failed coup of October 1923, put pressure on the politicians to proclaim the republic, which was approved almost unanimously in the Cortes. While the Venizellists wanted the model of the state to be decided by plebiscite, the radical republicans succeeded in having it chosen by parliamentary vote; thus the proclamation of the republic and the expulsion of the reigning dynasty were approved on 25 March 19240. A subsequent plebiscite (13 April) confirmed the preference for the republic. The campaign clearly separated the two Greek political groupings, with the Venizellists advocating the proclamation of the republic and the anti-Venizellists the permanence of the monarchy. Despite the clear result in favour of the republic, the main anti-Venizellist party, the People's Party led by Panagis Tsaldaris, refused to recognise the legitimacy of the new state system, which it took eight years to do.

The republic did not solve the economic problems, the refugee settlement problem or the successive clashes with neighbouring countries. It relied on countless parties, many of them mere platforms for their candidates and lacking a programme. Given the weakness of the political formations, there was a succession of unstable coalition governments. Cabinets were quickly replaced until the first military coup by the republican General Pangalos (25 June 1925), followed by the formal establishment of the dictatorship the following year (3 January 1926). Kafantaris was followed by a ministry headed by Alexandros Papanastasiou, supported until July 1924 by the liberal groups of Sophoulis and Michalakopoulos. Papanastasiu lost the support of the other groups and of important military officers after he succeeded in establishing the republic, as they rejected the economic and social reforms he intended to carry out. The presidency of the government then passed to Sophoulis and in October of the same year to Michalakopoulos, who suffered the Pangalos coup in June of the following year. The various liberal groups that emerged from the break-up of the Liberal Party competed during the months leading up to the establishment of General Pangalos' dictatorship to take over the government, while at the same time trying to win the support of the military, thereby fomenting indiscipline in the armed forces. Continued military meddling in politics, government instability, the country's growing disrepute abroad and workers‘ discontent, especially in the urban refugee settlements, led some of the bourgeoisie to welcome Pangalos’ coup d'état on 25 June 1925 with relief.

=== Pangalos dictatorship and Government of Unity (1925-1928) ===
Parliamentary elections
(7/11/1926, seats)
1. Popular Party (60) (21.0%)
2. Free Opinion Party (52) (18.0%)
3. Other anti-Venizelists (15) (5.00%)
4. Union of Liberals (108) (38.0%)
5. Agrarian-Labour Party (17) (6.00%)
6. Other Venizelists (18) (6.00%)
7. Agrarian Party (4) (1.00%)
8. Communist Party (10) (3.00%)
9. Others (2) (0.00%)
(Mavrogordatos, 1983, p. 35)

The second period of dictatorship of the period began in 1925, when General Theodoros Pangalos seized power; it lasted a few months before he himself was deposed in a new coup. Paradoxically, his coup d'état was expected, aroused almost no opposition and his military government even had the backing of Parliament, which he dissolved three months later, on 30 September. The day before, the Assembly had approved the promulgation of a new republican constitution. The general openly proclaimed himself dictator in January 1926. Pangalos, with no political programme beyond ending party disputes and press agitation, tried to calm national politics and improve the economy. Autocratic and sometimes eccentric, his government was also benevolent despite the condemnation of some political leaders. The general presented himself as the active militar ready to solve the country's problems, as he did with some of them before he earned the enmity of some of his republican and military followers with his purges. He was elected president of the republic with no real opponents on the ballot in April 1926. By then he was opposed by all parties, which initially supported an alternative presidential candidate, but decided at the last minute not to participate in the election. Party hostility and mismanagement of both the economy and foreign policy facilitated Pangalos' downfall. (Note: Pangalos adopted an offensive foreign policy against Bulgaria, whose territory he even invaded minimally, and Turkey, from which he planned to seize Eastern Thrace (Campbell, Sherrard, 1969, p. 134-135(.)

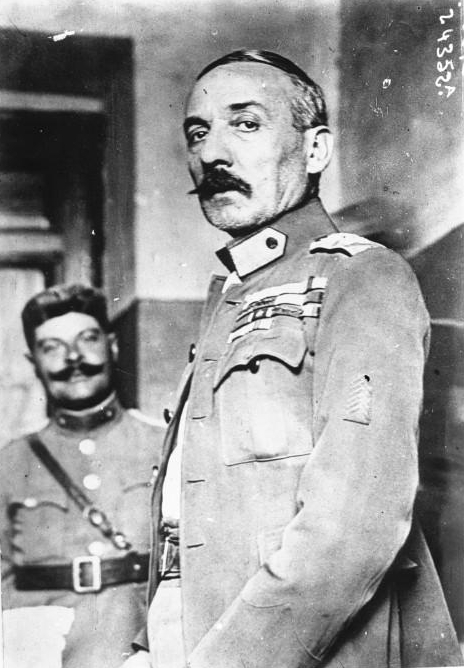
Pangalos in 1925, after seizing power in a coup d'état.

His Republican Guard, led by General Georgios Kondylis, overthrew him on 22 August 1926. The inability of the party leaders to agree on a grand coalition government, a demand with broad public support, especially among the urban middle classes, allowed Kondylis to temporarily preside over the Council of Ministers, although he was eventually pressured into abandoning the planned elections. Elections were held at the end of the year, this time with the participation of the populists, who were narrowly defeated by the republican parties. It was the first election to use proportional seat allocation. The victory was partly due to the fact that Kondylis made a first payment of promised compensation to the refugees, who until then had not received it and were threatening to abandon their traditional support for liberal candidates and put forward their own.

A broad coalition Council of Ministers was then chosen to approve the constitution, which had been pending since 1923. This was finally approved on 3 June 1927. The new cabinet was headed by the grey Alexandros Zaimis, who had the backing of all the major parties. The new government managed to balance the budget by raising taxes and reducing currency issuance. The board set up to consider the reinstatement of the monarchist soldiers expelled between 1917 and 1923 to reconcile republicans and monarchists failed to achieve its goal under the threat of the republican soldiers, who opposed it. Some of them regained their seats, however.

The first party to leave the grand coalition was the Popular Party in August 1927, which left its former allies the task of stabilising the economy. It was followed by the Agrarian-Labourites in February 1928. The disintegrating coalition gave way to a new Venizelos government months after he returned to the country in April 1927 and took office as Prime Minister on 3 July 1928; this cabinet immediately abolished proportional representation and called elections. Venizelos had also just regained the leadership of the liberals after ousting Kafantaris, who in May had finally managed to stabilise the drachma by imposing heavy taxation and raising costly foreign loans.

=== Return of Venizelos and republican crisis (1928-1932) ===
Parliamentary elections
(7/11/1926, seats)
1. Popular Party (23.94) (24.0%)
2. Free Opinion Party (5.3) (5.00%)
3. Independent Royalists (3.79) (4.00%)
4. Liberal Party (46.94) (47.0%)
5. Agrarian-Labour Party (6.71) (7.00%)
6. National Republican Party (2.71) (3.00%)
7. Progresist Party (2.53) (2.00%)
8. Conservative Republican Party (1.56) (2.00%)
9. Progresist Union (1.32) (1.00%)
10. Independent Republicans (1.78) (2.00%)
11. Others (3.24) (3.00%)
(Mavrogordatos, 1983, p. 35)
Parliamentary elections
(19/8/1928, seats)
1. Popular Party (19) (8.00%)
2. Free Opinion Party (1) (0.00%)
3. Independent Royalists (4) (2.00%)
4. Liberal Party (178) (71.0%)
5. Agrarian-Labour Party (20) (8.00%)
6. National Republican Party (9) (4.00%)
7. Progresist Party (3) (1.00%)
8. Conservative Republican Party (5) (2.00%)
9. Progresist Union (5) (2.00%)
10. Independent Republicans (6) (2.00%)
(Mavrogordatos, 1983, p. 38)

Venizelos returned to the presidency on 4 July 1928 for the fifth time, and won a landslide victory over his rivals in the following elections on 19 August (223 seats out of 250, although a third of the votes went to the monarchists). Essentially, he rallied almost all of Venizelism around him, with the exception of Kafantaris, who stood on his own with his new Progressive Party, while his anti-Venizelist opponents were divided to their disadvantage, because of the allocation of seats by the majority system. Only fifteen royalist MPs were elected and the country, tired of past instability, opted for Venizelos as a strong leader to lead the government. The republic had had ten cabinets in five years until Venizelos' return to power. Representatives of all parties had called for an end to his exile in order to end political instability.

Venizelos' was the third longest cabinet in Greek history until then, lasting until 1932, and was one of the few with a real government programme that had social, economic and administrative modernisation as its main objective. Venizelos implemented some reforms quickly, such as the restoration of the Senate, and signed a friendship agreement with Italy in an attempt to improve relations with the neighbouring country, which aspired to dominate the Mediterranean and held the Dodecanese. One of the government's main goals was economic development by promoting agricultural production for domestic consumption rather than for export, which was to serve both to improve the domestic supply of wheat, traditionally in short supply, and to increase farmers' incomes and thus domestic demand. This was to encourage the growth of domestic industry, which was supported by protectionist measures and which had cheap labour at its disposal (refugees and peasant immigration to the cities). His government carried out a number of reforms, such as the creation of an Agricultural Bank, the implementation of public works to drain marshes and the creation of new schools, as well as major investments in communications, financed on credit (foreign loans). He did not, however, put an end to military meddling in Greek politics, but used those who supported him against the opposition. Nor did he put an end to corruption, and Venizelos himself generally disengaged from domestic politics to concentrate on international politics, where he achieved notable successes. The development plan required a long period of political, social and economic stability, which was not forthcoming. The economic crisis and the growing conservatism of the bourgeoisie undermined support for Venizelism, which had already lost the support of the workers in the post-war period.

Parliamentary elections
(25/9/1932, seats)
1. Popular Party (95) (37.0%)
2. Free Opinion Party (3) (1.00%)
3. Liberal Party (98) (38.0%)
4. Agrarian-Labour Party (8) (3.00%)
5. National Radical Party (6) (2.00%)
6. Progresist Party (15) (6.00%)
7. Conservative Republican Party (2) (1.00%)
8. Independent Venizelists (2) (1.00%)
9. Independent Republicans (6) (2.00%)
10. Agrarian Party (11) (4.00%)
11. Communist Party (10) (4.00%)
(Mavrogordatos, 1983, p. 42)

The division among the Republicans, who were sometimes willing to oppose Venizelos in order to regain the limelight, the corruption of some of his collaborators and, above all, the growing economic depression, took their toll on the Prime Minister's popularity in the early 1930s. Nor did Venizelos manage to avoid worsening relations with both the anti-Venizelist opposition and with some of the Venizelos factions, which from 1930 onwards began to strongly oppose the government. Depression hit the country at the end of 1931, following the British abandonment of the gold standard in September. (Note: The Greek currency was linked to the British currency (Basch, 1943, p. 147)) Faced with the depression, the two main parties, the right-wing liberal Venizelos party and the monarchist populist party, were neither prepared nor willing to implement far-reaching reforms that could have alleviated the economic crisis. The populists, however, had the advantage of being in opposition and being able to blame the crisis on the Liberal government. The Liberals tried to maintain development projects for several months despite the economic situation. The Republicans, for their part, feared that the monarchists would use the discontent over the economic crisis to try to restore the monarchy. Despite the seriousness of the economic and social situation, the Communist Party won just eight MPs and the fascists were down to two.

In March 1932 Tsaldaris refused to form a Council of Ministers with Venizelos; in May the formation of a broad coalition government or a government uniting the Venizelos groups failed again, and Venizelos resumed the premiership. In June he had to make cuts in the face of a lack of foreign loans, decided to apply the system of proportional allocation of seats for the next elections, and tensed the political situation to hide the government's failures, presenting himself as the champion of the republic in the face of the opposition, which he accused of wanting to restore the monarchy. Venizelos' weakening was evident in the elections of 25 September 1932, in which he lost his parliamentary majority, although he did manage to undermine his rivals from the minor parties.

When the populist Tsaldaris again refused to enter into a coalition government with Venizelos, the latter allowed him to form a cabinet of his own which, with only 103 representatives, was at the mercy of the opposition. It lasted barely two months, while parliament was not in session. Venizelos forced Tsaldaris to resign in January 1933 and called new elections to break the political deadlock. The Venizelists had sacked Tsaldaris' cabinet for fear that Kondyilis and Metaxas, his allies, would undermine their position in the civil service and especially in the army. Venizelos became Prime Minister for the seventh and last time, at the head of a coalition of Venizelos' parties and the Agrarian Party, with which he contested the elections, held once again under the majority system of seat allocation. The United Opposition, made up of the parties of Tsaldaris, Metaxas, some agrarian parties and Kondilis‘ National Radical Party, which had tried in vain to join the Prime Minister's alliance, stood against Venizelos’ National Coalition. It was the most polarised political moment since the 1920 elections and the election campaign was mainly about the economic crisis, with mutual attacks.

=== Defeat of Venizelos (1933-1935) ===
Parliamentary elections
(5/3/1933, seats)
1. Popular Party (118) (48.0%)
2. Free Opinion Party (6) (2.00%)
3. National Radical Party (11) (4.00%)
4. Agrarians (1) (0.00%)
5. Liberal Party (80) (32.0%)
6. Agrarian-Labour (13) (5.00%)
7. Progresist Party (10) (5.00%)
8. Conservative Republican Party (2) (1.00%)
9. Agrarians (Mylonas) (5) (2.00%)
10. Agrarian Party (2) (1.00%)
(Mavrogordatos, 1983, p. 45)
Parliamentary Elections
(5/3/1933, % of votes)
1. Popular Party (38.0%)
2. Free Opinion Party (2.00%)
3. National Radical Party (4.00%)
4. Agrarian (2.00%)
5. Liberal Party (33.0%)
6. Agrarian-Labour Party (4.00%)
7. Progresist Party (7.00%)
8. Conservative Republican Party (1.00%)
9. Agrarians (Mylonas) (1.00%)
10. Agrarian Party (2.00%)
11. Communist Party (5.00%)
12. Others (1.00%)
(Mavrogordatos, 1983, p. 45)

The Populist party, monarchist and in opposition for most of the interwar period, won the March 1933 elections, mainly because of the system of distribution of seats, as the two electoral blocs were almost evenly matched in terms of votes. Venizelos had been wrong in his assessment of the political situation, and Tsaldaris' recognition of the population had brought him part of the Republican vote dissatisfied with Venizelos.

On 5 March 1933, when the Liberal defeat had just been announced, General Nikolaos Plastiras tried in vain to overthrow the new conservative government, from which he feared a restoration of the monarchy and a purge of republican officers. Plastiras was forced to flee in the face of almost total lack of support, and Venizelos faced an unfounded parliamentary accusation of collusion in the coup brought by Metaxas. The generals to whom Plastiras ceded power handed it over to the winners of the elections, and Tsaldaris formed his second and last government on 10 March, joined by Kondylis and Metaxas. The failed coup and Venizelos' defence of Plastiras in the Cortes as he defended himself against the accusation of instigating the coup strained the transfer of power, the first to the anti-Venizelists in a decade.

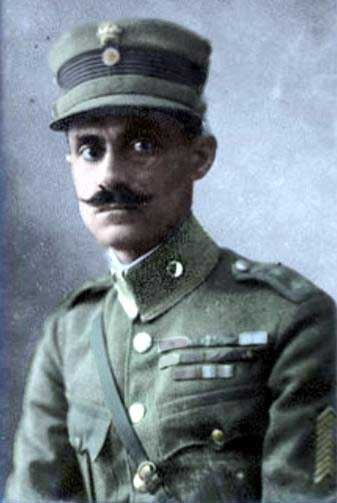
Nikolaos Plastiras, a military officer and leader of the 1922 coup that brought down the monarchist government and tried to bring down the conservative government in 1933 and 1935, precipitating instead the restoration of the monarchy. The interwar period was plagued by military interventions in the country's politics.

Venizelos suffered an assassination attempt on 6 June, organised by the new head of the Security Police appointed by Tsaldaris. The coup and the attack on Venizelos radicalised the political situation between the two opposing camps. The conservative government tried to delay the investigation into the attack, which appeared to be the work of the police, and this increased the discontent of the Republicans, who again backed Venizelos. The National Coalition of the latter set up an organisation on 3 July in anticipation of armed clashes with the anti-Venizelos camp, which was joined by both active and reserve officers. Tension grew in the following months for a variety of reasons: the slow investigation of the attack on Venizelos, Kondylis‘ attempts to reform the army and deprive republican officers of power, the government's electoral reforms, the government's refusal to hold certain joint sessions between the lower and upper houses, Venizelos’ criticism of the signing of the Balkan Entente and the intense rumours that Metaxas and Kondylis were plotting a coup d'état and restoring the monarchy. Attempts to reconcile the moderates of the two groups failed successively, both because of the intransigence of Venizelos and Kondilis and because of Tsaldaris' inability to control his more radical supporters.

Another failed coup in March 1935 by Venizelos‘ officers with the support of Venizelos’ Liberal Party, which sought to prevent monarchical restoration, had the opposite effect: the purge of Venizelos' officers and the return of the ruler, George II of Greece. Venizelos had agreed to support the coup in January, following repeated delays in the trial of the attempt on his life in November and December 1934. The plan was to cede power to the military led by Plastiras. The coup was thwarted by Kondylis, then Minister of War in the Tsaldaris government. The populists also removed the liberals' supporters from the Public Administration, which strengthened their control of the state, along with the abolition of the hitherto Venizelist-controlled Senate. The rebel fleet units and Venizelos himself fled to the Italian Dodecanese. Venizelos was sentenced to death in absentia. Plastiras went into exile in France.

Only conservative parties participated in the June elections. The failure of the coup and the subsequent repression disarmed the Venizelists and favoured their more radical opponents, Metaxas and Kondylis, to whom Tsaldaris was losing ground. By then Metaxas had already left the government and was openly advocating the restoration of the monarchy, despite Tsaldaris' statements that the republic was not in danger. He defeated Metaxas by a wide margin in the June elections, presenting himself, with Kondylis, as the guarantor of the maintenance of the republic against the royalist Metaxas. Fear of the violence that Metaxas could unleash, however, led Tsaldaris to maintain his call for a state model. Kondylis also surprisingly came out in favour of the monarchy on 3 July, which increased the pressure on Tsaldaris. He yielded to pressure from monarchist radicals and officials and tabled a motion for a plebiscite on the state model on 10 July, which was to be held on 15 November. Kondylis gradually moved away from Tsaldaris and towards fascist positions.

The royalist military were suspicious of Tsaldaris' vacillations and the outcome of the plebiscite and forced his resignation in favour of Kondylis in a military coup on 10 October. Kondylis assumed the presidency of the Council of Ministers, openly persecuting liberals and leftists. (Note: The Communist Party was banned, but the subsequent amnesty enacted on the return of the king allowed it to participate in the January 1936 elections (Cliadakis, 1979, p. 129).) The coup was later backed by the British, who were eager to achieve monarchical restoration and not to disturb the new government during the Abyssinian crisis. The king allowed it, even though on the day of the coup the royalist foreign minister had assured him that it was unnecessary and that a vote was scheduled that would legally validate the restoration. The remnants of Tsaldaris' party —eighty-two deputies, after the withdrawal of Tsaldaris and most of the party from the Cortes— assumed all powers, abolished the republic, restored the 1911 Constitution and held the plebiscite, rigged to restore the monarchy (3 November 1935, with 97% voting in favour of the king's return).

=== Restoration (1935-1936) ===
Parliamentary elections (26/1/1936 seats)
1. Popular Party (72) (24.0%)
2. Free Opinion Party (7) (2.00%)
3. General Popular Radical Union (60) (20.0%)
4. National Reform Party (4) (1.00%)
5. Liberal Party (126) (42.0%)
6. Republican Coalition (11) (4.00%)
7. Other Venizelists (4) (1.00%)
8. Agrarian Party (1) (0.00%)
9. Communist Party (15) (5.00%)
(Mavrogordatos, 1983, p. 52)

The monarchical restoration was widely approved (97.87% of the votes in favour in the totally fraudulent plebiscite of 3 November 1935). King George II of Greece returned to Athens after eleven years of British exile on 25 November. The republican parties initially refused to accept regime change, but Venizelos thwarted the republican front by agreeing to recognise the legitimacy of the monarch in exchange for the restoration of the parliamentary system and the granting of a general amnesty. The liberals also agreed with the Popular Party to a new constitution, the use of the proportional system for allocating seats in elections and a future joint Council of Ministers.

After his return to Greece, George disappointed the ultra-monarchists by refusing to become their leader and granting an amnesty to the republicans, leading to Kondylis' resignation on 30 November, which was surprisingly accepted, and his replacement by a new prime minister with no political experience, Konstantinos Demertzis, a moderate.

Demertzis returned the civil servants purged by the populists and the royalist military to their posts, but not the republican officers. He called elections for January 1936, the results of which showed a recovery of the Liberals, although both the Venizelists and the anti-Venizelists ran in a very fragmented way. The campaign was violent and acrimonious, and the Republicans suffered intense harassment.

The elections of 26 January 1936 produced a close result that prevented the formation of a government, given the disagreements between the two major political blocs of Venizelists and anti-Venizelists. Rather than a difference of principle, the failure of the negotiations was due to the desire of the two sides to control the government and, with it, the ability of their respective supporters to be rewarded. Both parties also wanted to gain control of the army. Between the 143 populists and the 142 liberals, the 15 communist deputies had the ability to give the government to one side or the other, in the absence of agreement between them.

The Liberals and Communists reached a pact on 19 February so that the Liberals could win the government in exchange for the approval of certain reformist measures, although the Communists had also negotiated with the Populists. The leader of the Liberals, Themistoklis Sofoulis, was elected President of Parliament, but left Demertzis to form a new cabinet that included Metaxas as Deputy Prime Minister and Minister of War on 14 March in the face of the King's and the military's threat not to allow a communist-backed government. Metaxas was supposed to subdue the military, which had been on the verge of a coup d'état after the elections, which the king himself prevented. However, Demertzis died on 13 April and the king appointed Metaxas in his place without consulting the parties, who nevertheless firmly backed him in the 25 April motion of confidence; he was seen as a mere transitional prime minister until the two major parties could reach a pact. Despite the Communists‘ insistence on defeating Metaxas in Parliament, Sofoulis did not dare in the face of the military threat and approved Metaxas’ government by decree for five months, during which time Parliament was suspended, a situation imposed at the monarch's behest. Although a parliamentary committee was supposed to monitor the new prime minister's performance, in practice Metaxas ruled at will from then on, heading a royal dictatorship, according to the US ambassador.

=== Metaxas dictatorship (1936-1941) ===
Metaxas deported the main trade union leaders and dissolved the most militant unions, while preparing a military coup. The communists responded with strikes and demonstrations, which intensified after Metaxas took office as prime minister, although they had a strong economic motivation because of the country's poor economic situation. A general strike in Thessaloniki resulted in 30 deaths and 400 injuries. The Macedonian government handed over to a general, who restored order in the area through violence. The communist party then called a nationwide general strike for 5 August 1936. Despite a last-minute agreement between liberals and monarchists to replace Metaxas in October, which was presented to the king on 22 July, he rejected the proposal on 3 August 1936 and supported Metaxas' coup the day after.

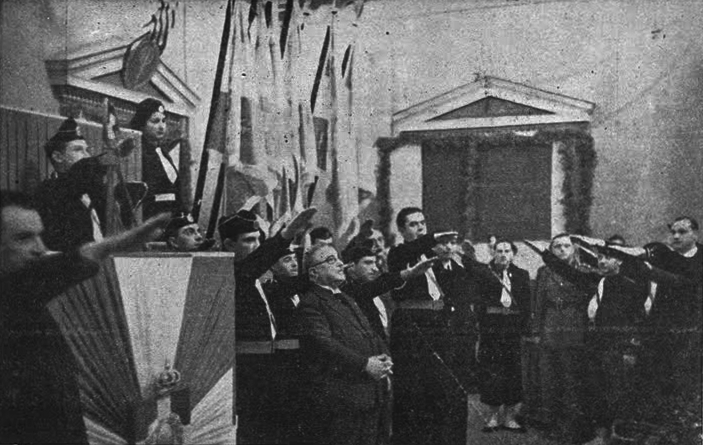
Ioannis Metaxas surrounded by members of the dictatorship's youth organisation, EON.

In the face of the inability of the Venizelists and the anti-Venizelists to agree, retired General Ioannis Metaxas won the King's backing to impose a dictatorship, receiving the backing of the Cortes to suspend some fundamental rights. The main Greek politicians who could have hindered the general's manoeuvres (Venizelos, Tsaldaris, Kondilis and Demertzis) died between November 1935 and August 1936, when Metaxas finally established his authoritarian government with royal backing. Metaxas, the prime minister, also took over the defence and foreign affairs portfolios. The dictatorial regime became known as the regime’ after the day it was established. Metaxas eventually dissolved parliament, banned political parties and arrested opponents of the dictatorship. The communist opposition was dismantled and the opposition of the traditional parties proved ineffective. Metaxas used deportation to the islands to get rid of suspected opponents of the dictatorship, often communists or members of the banned parties. The dictatorship entrenched state control by monarchical anti-Venizelism, a process that had begun with the election victory of 1933.

The main mode of domination of Greek society, in addition to the tight control of the press and the strengthening of the security services, was the creation of the National Youth Organisation (EON), which was modelled on the German Hitler Youth and the Italian balillas and grew to a million members. (Note: The organization excluded minority citizens and those who professed a religion other than Greek Orthodox Christianity (Pelt, 2001, p. 159).) It lacked, however, a mass organisation of its own, unlike the Italian and German ideological models.

Metaxas worked hard to solve the country's serious problems, although the effectiveness of his actions is controversial. He passed a series of social measures (creation of the minimum wage, paid holidays, social security) that significantly improved the situation of workers in theory. The implementation of these reforms was less ideal because of the absence of trade unions. The dictatorship's public works plan, despite significantly increasing debt and inflation, provided jobs and strengthened the country's defences. (Note: Pelt notes that the German embassy estimated that unemployment dropped significantly during the dictatorship: from one hundred and twenty-eight thousand people in 1936 to twenty-six thousand in 1937 and only fifteen thousand in 1939, although he cautions that these are not very reliable figures (Pelt, 2001, p. 156).) The dictatorship tried to present itself as pro-labour and an alternative to both communism and trade unions through its social measures.

The Metaxas dictatorship, despite the profound changes it brought about in the country's domestic politics, did not substantially alter the nation's foreign policy, which remained favourable to the United Kingdom. Greece's military and economic dependence on the UK ensured continuity.

The Abyssinian crisis prompted the start of Greek rearmament in response to the concerns of the army's high command, which was convinced that it was not in a position to wage a modern war with the means that were being used in the African war. In addition to certain reorganisation measures taken as early as the end of 1935, Greece began to buy armaments from Germany, taking advantage of the debt accumulated by Germany under the barter system. The development of the domestic armaments industry was also undertaken, with German collaboration; by 1939, it was already the leading armaments industry in the Balkans and the Middle East.

The regime, disliked by the middle classes and communists, survived until 1941 thanks to the disunity of the opposition and the apathy of the majority of the peasant population. It also had the constant support of the king, who controlled the armed forces.

=== World War II ===
Greece forged closer ties with the United Kingdom while trying not to displease Germany after the Italian occupation of Albania on 7 April 1939. The UK granted a territorial guarantee to Greece against any Italian attack.

With the outbreak of World War II, however, Metaxas tried to win Italy's sympathy, with the aim of keeping Greece out of the conflict, while signing a trade agreement with the United Kingdom. The fall of France in June 1940 made Greece's attitude towards Italy even more conciliatory, despite Italy's coolness towards Greek efforts to improve relations. Greece's position was precarious: in 1939, 42.7% of its imports came from Germany and 10.9% from Italy. The Greek government tried to get Germany to prevent Italian intervention in the Balkans.

Italian propaganda against Greece enabled the country to prepare for the future attack, which on several occasions seemed imminent. Finally, in the face of German victories and the dispatch, without consulting Rome, of a German military mission to Romania in October 1940 in what was theoretically an Italian zone of influence, Mussolini ordered the attack on Greece in an attempt to maintain control in his zone of influence in the Balkans. The Italians presented an ultimatum to Greece on 28 October, which marked the beginning of the Greek-Italian War and the country's entry into World War II.

== International politics ==
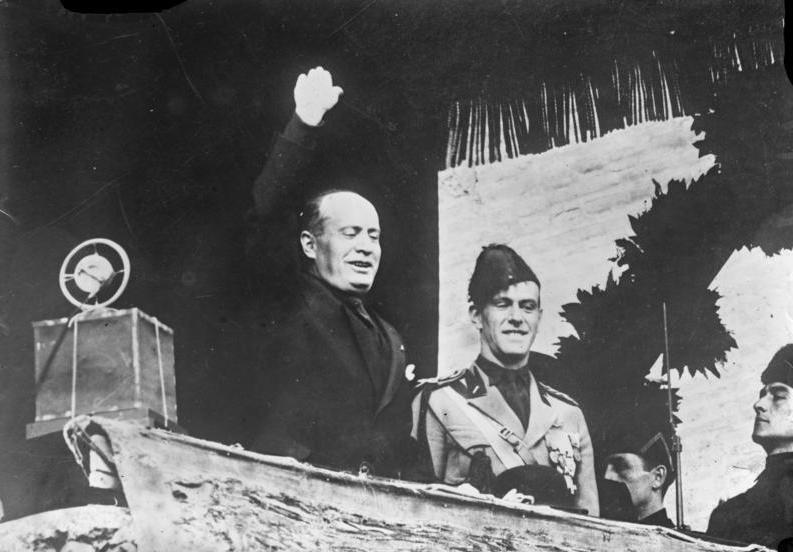
Mussolini, the Italian dictator, maintained generally poor relations with Greece during the interwar period because of Italy's imperialist ambitions in the Mediterranean.

Defeat by Turkey in 1922 led to a substantial change in traditional Greek foreign policy, based on the expansionism of the megali idea. Greece sought, without the backing of the victors of World War I, to consolidate its territory, but soon encountered Italian expansionist hostility in the Mediterranean. Between 1923 and 1928 Italy posed a major threat to Greek security.

One of Greece's first foreign policy actions in this historical period was the signing of peace with Turkey in July 1923. The military who had dominated the government since the coup at the end of the previous year entrusted the negotiation to the exiled Eleftherios Venizelos.

=== Disputes with neighbouring countries ===
Shortly after the establishment of the republic, incidents with neighbouring countries followed. Italian troops occupied the island of Corfu in August 1923, eventually evacuating it, but not without causing Greek disillusionment with the workings of the League of Nations, which refused to arbitrate the dispute. The cause of the Italian intervention had been the murder of an Italian officer on Greek territory during the drawing of the Greek-Albanian border, a crime that was never solved, but for which Mussolini accused the Greeks. International public opinion, opposed to Italian military intervention, forced the withdrawal in exchange for monetary compensation.

Greece also had major border incidents with Bulgaria. The two countries had agreed on 29 September 1924 to recognise the Slav minority in northern Greece as Bulgarian and thereby bring it under the protection of the League of Nations' minority treaties, but Yugoslav opposition and protests in Greece led the Athenian government to rescind the pact. In October 1925, after the death of two Greek soldiers, the Greek army occupied part of Bulgaria, which requested the help of the League of Nations. The League of Nations ordered Greece to withdraw and both sides to pay compensation for the occupation and for the deaths of the soldiers.

Relations with Yugoslavia and Turkey were not good either. Between 1923 and 1929, disagreement continued between the Greeks and Yugoslavs over concessions to the latter in the port of Thessaloniki, which Yugoslavia considered meagre. The two countries' antagonism with neighbouring Bulgaria, however, served to mitigate disagreements and strengthen ties. With Turkey there were various disagreements (the status of the Greek population in Istanbul, the property of emigrants, etc.) which were not resolved until 1930.

The situation with Albania was also tense, with Greece claiming the south of the neighbouring country as its own, which it considered Northern Epirus, and the Orthodox or Greek-speaking population as Greek nationals. In turn, the government in Tirana demanded recognition of the rights of the Albanian minority in north-western Greece. The latter avoided claiming the southern Albanian territories essentially to avoid provoking Italy, which was becoming increasingly influential in the neighbouring country.

=== Bilateral agreements and improving relations ===
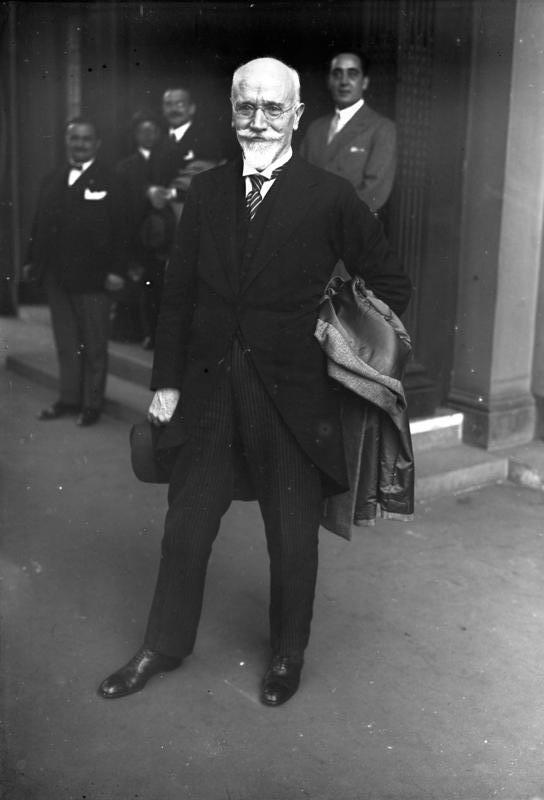
Eleftherios Venizelos, a key figure in Greek history in the first half of the 20th century, in Berlin at the end of 1929, during his last term in office.

Faced with the apparent ineffectiveness of the Society, Greek governments tried to secure the country through bilateral agreements, and one was reached with Italy itself on Venizelos' return to government in 1928 (23 September 1928). This was followed by another with Mustafa Kemal's Turkey in June and October 1930, which put an end to the disputes between the two countries and ushered in a period of understanding between the two nations. Venizelos' desire to avoid competition with Turkey in the Aegean Sea, which could prove costly and hinder development plans, and Kemal's modernising plans paved the way for an agreement between the two nations. Venizelos, in order to maintain good relations with the United Kingdom, the leading power in the Mediterranean, declined to support Greek irredentism in Cyprus, then under London administration, where there was an uprising in 1931. It sought to avoid Greek dependence on a single power by maintaining good relations with countries with a Mediterranean presence and with neighbouring nations. He reached a new agreement with the Yugoslavs on 17 March 1929 on the use of the port of Thessaloniki, which resulted in the signing of a treaty of friendship and arbitration a month later. Relations with Bulgaria did not improve as much: their access to the Aegean remained unresolved despite Venizelos' concessions, which were insufficient for the Bulgarian authorities, who only agreed to re-establish diplomatic relations. Venizelos achieved the greatest success of his term in office on 10 June 1930 by reaching an agreement with Turkey on the outstanding issues between the two nations, which led to the signing of friendship and trade agreements a few months later.

With the defeat of Venizelos and the victory of the Conservatives in 1933, the period of bilateral agreements came to an end and Greece entered a multinational coalition (the Balkan Pact [1934]), aligning Greece even more closely with the United Kingdom and worsened the relationship with Italy, which was opposed to maintaining the situation in the Balkans. This alliance, which brought together Greece, Turkey, Romania and Yugoslavia, aimed to maintain the territorial status quo in the Balkans, essentially thwarting Bulgarian expansionist aspirations. The Greek rapprochement with the United Kingdom, already evident during the Abyssinian crisis, was due to fear of Italy and the changing international situation at the time. Until 1935, however, good relations with Italy, United Kingdom and France were not contradictory, given the Franco-Italian talks to form a league against Hitler, which ultimately failed. The Abyssinian crisis awakened British strategic interest in Greece as a foothold in the eastern Mediterranean. An initial attempt to maintain neutrality and distance the country from its Balkan allies soon gave way to closer ties with the United Kingdom, the leading power in the Mediterranean.

The Greek government saw Italy as the main threat to the country since the Abyssinian War, and from 1938 onwards it became concerned about Bulgaria. Greek leaders tried unsuccessfully to obtain a British territorial guarantee for Bulgaria in the same year and even to collude with Italy after the Munich Agreements. The United Kingdom was unable to compete commercially with Germany, both in arms supplies and in the purchase of Greek tobacco.

== Economy and society ==
Classification by occupation (1928 census)
1. Agriculture (44.0%)
2. Livestock (7.00%)
3. Fisheries (1.00%)
4. Manufacturing (17.0%)
5. Transport and communications (5.00%)
6. Finance (1.00%)
7. Trade (9.00%)
8. Services (1.00%)
9. Liberal professions (3.00%)
10. Civil service (2.00%)
11. Others (10.0%)
(Mavrogordatos, 1983, p. 119). The service includes barbers, servants and shoeshine boys (Mavrogordatos, 1983, p. 118).
Liberal professions also include teachers, priests or artists (Mavrogordatos, 1983, p. 118).
Other is a general category that encompasses unemployed people, from students to renters to beggars (Mavrogordatos, 1983, p. 118).
Social composition by class
(1928 census)
1. Petite bourgeoisie (26.0%)
2. Workers (21.0%)
3. Farmers (51.0%)
4. Others (2.00%)
(Mavrogordatos, 1983, p. 118)

=== General characteristics ===
Women were almost completely excluded from political and social life in interwar Greece.

The interwar Greek economy was primarily agrarian and had significant foreign dependencies. The only major mining industry was aluminium mining, which was an export industry; the only notable industry was cotton textiles. Rail transport was almost entirely dependent on imported British coal.

The country's agriculture also suffered from major imbalances: only 12% of the agricultural land was given over to cereals, and the mountainous areas were permanently short of food. At the time, the country imported a large quantity of grain. More than half of the population was engaged in agriculture, although only about 20 % of the land was arable. The population was mainly rural, with fewer than ten towns with more than 15,000 inhabitants. This did not prevent some cities from growing considerably: Athens, the capital, which at the beginning of the century had less than 200,000 inhabitants, had around half a million in the 1920s and exceeded 1 million before the outbreak of the World War II. The rapid population growth, common throughout the Balkans at this time, exacerbated the plight of the peasantry through the parcelling out of property. In addition, it is estimated that around half of the rural population was surplus to the level of production. United States' immigration restrictions, imposed in the early 1920s, exacerbated the problem of rural underemployment. The promotion of industry was not enough to absorb this surplus farmer population, a feature again common to the whole region. The poor economic situation of the large peasantry did not lead to the emergence of a strong agrarian party, and the peasants followed the political issues imposed by the bourgeois parties, essentially the state model. (Note: An Agrarian Party was founded in 1923, but its internal disputes, the clientelist networks of the big parties and the petty-bourgeois aspirations of a large part of the farmers meant that it rarely obtained more than 6% of the vote in the successive elections of the time (Ploumidis, 2013, p. 112).)

Industry grew considerably at the time, but from a very low level and with poor conditions for the workers, who were few in number even on the eve of the World War II: 280,311 in 1930 and barely more than 350,000 in 1938. Most of the workers worked in workshops and small industries, not in large factories, with little social, economic or ethnic differences with their employers. Often owners of a house or land in their home village, they were ideologically close to their former peasant or petty bourgeois neighbours. Only a few minor sectors and groups, such as refugees, developed a strong labour movement, despite poor working conditions in industry. (Note: Unemployment was high and wages were lower than before World War I (Mavrogordatos, 1983, p. 145).) (Note: The settlement of refugees generally worsened working conditions and complicated advocacy for improvements at work (Mavrogordatos, 1983, p. 145).)

The balance of trade was consistently and intensely negative during the period: between 1923 and 1929, imports were twice the value of exports, a situation that did not improve substantially during the Great Depression. So was the balance of payments, which only balanced foreign loans until they disappeared as a result of the Great Depression.

Another main feature of the country's economy was the weakness of the private sector, which led to an extensive clientelist system in which those who controlled the state, the main economic engine of the nation in the absence of a prominent bourgeoisie, used it for their own benefit and that of their supporters. State interventionism in the economy led to the growth of the civil service, which often obtained its position thanks to the favouritism of political leaders in exchange for their electoral support.

The state, the main engine of the economy, was in permanent deficit, which prevented long-term investment and development plans. Two peculiar contributions to the Greek economy were the large-scale contribution of the merchant navy and the remittances of the many emigrants (around half a million between 1830 and 1920), which had kept the country's population almost stable despite the high birth rate.

=== Phases ===
The Greek economy went through several major periods in the interwar period:

- A period of post-war depression between 1923 and 1927, marked by the burden of resettling refugees from the war with Turkey and the unsuccessful attempts of successive governments to maintain the value of the drachma.
- A short period of some growth and stability of the drachma between 1927 and 1932, hampered by the Great Depression.
- Another period of crisis due to the bankruptcy of 1932, when the country defaulted on its foreign debt.

=== Post-war period ===
Inflation had devalued the drachma before the military defeat of 1922, but the trend became more pronounced in the post-war period. The arrival of the huge number of refugees —more than a million people, a fifth of the country's population— (Note: The population in 1918 was estimated at 5.17 million (Basch, 1943, p. 11).) and their needs plunged Greece's balance of payments. Domestic production could not meet the rapid growth in demand, leading to large imports of goods and capital, which in turn increased the need for foreign exchange and devalued the drachma, further depressed by the government's methods of financing budget deficits. The trade deficit and the need to care for refugees led to international borrowing and currency devaluation. Continued fluctuation made currency speculation attractive, which drew local capital away from investment between 1923 and 1926. Attempts to raise interest rates to encourage savings and investment failed, hampering the development of domestic industry. Continued political instability complicated the attraction of foreign investors.

Industry grew rapidly but unevenly during the 1920s, both because of rising demand and because of falling wages due to the arrival of refugees and state support for development. The cheap labour provided by urban refugees favoured Greek industry, but also facilitated poor working conditions (child labour, long working hours, low wages, etc.). Protectionism also encouraged industrial development, but of small, inefficient firms, dependent on cheap labour and low capital investment. In the short term, however, it served to alleviate the problem of unemployment.

The government decreed forced credit during the Pangalos dictatorship because of the impossibility of obtaining credit from abroad due to the default on debt repayments to the major powers and the need to avoid issuing currency to prevent further inflation. The money was to be used to pay for the invasion of Turkish Eastern Thrace. After the fall of Pangalos and under pressure from international creditors, the new coalition cabinet imposed a balanced budget by reducing public spending in the hope of attracting foreign investors, but weakened economic growth.

In the countryside, the World War and post-war period saw a major land reform that handed land ownership to the farmers and essentially eliminated the landlords. This was carried out partly in order to settle the refugees, who greatly increased the amount of land under cultivation in the country by 55%. They also improved cultivation methods and tobacco production. In total, about 38% of the arable land was redistributed in the land reform. More than half of the redistributed plots had previously belonged to Turks or Bulgarians who had left Greece. The reform, however, failed to improve the situation of the peasantry, which suffered from overpopulation (40-50%). The handover of land was not accompanied by the necessary accompanying measures to make the reform effective: credit, technical assistance and state training for the new landowners was minimal or non-existent. The peasantry suffered from the world agrarian crisis of the 1920s, even before the Great Depression, which was particularly severe in Europe and was due to overproduction, which depressed prices. The fall in prices meant that the average income of the peasants was significantly lower than the national average and threatened to plunge them into poverty. (Note: The average income of a Greek peasant family was about USD 282.4, while the national average was USD 377.9 (Ploumidis, 2013, 113-114).) Farmers' debts to banks and moneylenders grew, reaching 43.3% of the income of this social group in 1937 and affecting 70% of the collective. The poor state of the countryside accentuated the traditional emigration of Greek farmers, who had been moving intensively to America until 1922, but from then onwards to Greek cities. (Note: Emigration was most intense in the Aegean Islands, the Ionian Islands, the Peloponnese, Epirus, Crete and the lands south of Thessaly, in this order of incidence (Ploumidis, 2013, p. 114).) This process was reflected in the rapid growth of the population of the capital and its environs from 802,000 in 1928 to 1,124,109 in 1940; 200,000 of these new inhabitants were immigrants from the countryside.

The settlement of the huge numbers of refugees was left not to the government but to an organisation partly independent of it, the Refugee Settlement Commission, which was disbanded in 1930 after settling 145,758 families, mainly in Macedonia and western Thrace. The commission was supported by the League of Nations, which enabled it to obtain two international loans to finance its work. The situation of the refugees who settled in the main cities was worse, both because of the lack of work and the poor housing conditions. The Commission built 27,000 houses for them, but even so, by 1930 some 30,000 families were still living in barracks and shacks. The cost of the settlement process was gigantic (it absorbed half of the state budget for several years and several foreign loans), but it also served to stimulate Greek industry and agriculture, hitherto stagnant.

=== Stabilisation and depression ===
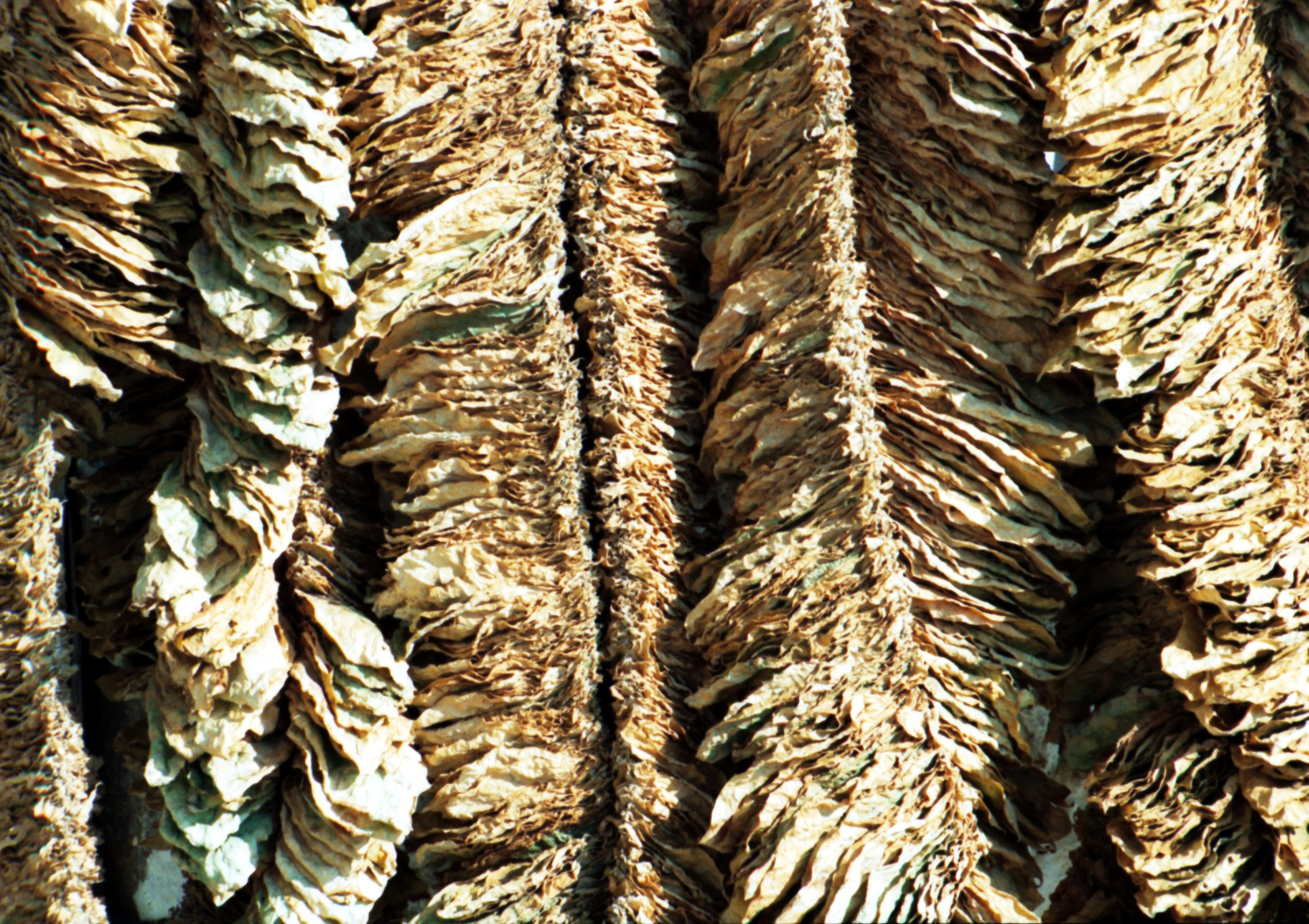
Greek tobacco, one of the country's main exports. It suffered heavily from the collapse of world trade during the Great Depression, causing unrest in the producing areas. Much of the production was sold to Germany in the late interwar period.

The Bank of Greece was established as the nation's central bank in 1928 at the behest of foreign lenders, with powers to issue currency, control its circulation, the volume of credit and set interest rates. The value of the currency finally stabilised in the same year, but at the cost of losing 95% of its value compared to the pre-World War I era.

Foreign investment, especially indirect, poured into the country in large quantities after disputes with the powers over Greek war debts were settled. Venizelos began to carry out extensive public works, previously planned, for which he had to apply for large international loans in 1928 and 1931. He set up the Agricultural Bank in 1929, which was to enable farmers to obtain credit on better terms. He based his national development plans —essentially in defence of the bourgeoisie that supported him electorally— on foreign capital, which required increasing exports to obtain the foreign exchange to pay for them. The advent of the Great Depression hit Greece hard because of the above-mentioned needs: it sharply reduced its exports and, from 1931 onwards, deprived it of financing because of the drastic reduction in the movement of capital, which eliminated international credits. Remittances from emigrants also declined drastically. Between 1917 and 1932, Greece's foreign debt had grown from $360 million to $790 million, or two-thirds of the national budget. The government feared social unrest and the threat it could pose to the bourgeois social order, so as early as 1929, just at the beginning of the Great Depression, it passed laws clearly directed against communist agitation, which were also used against the trade unions and the labour movement in general. One of the measures to alleviate discontent was the moratorium on the payment of loans taken out by farmers, which was enacted in 1931 for five years and decreed again in 1937 for twelve years. Another, also aimed at both improving the situation in the countryside and preventing possible anti-bourgeois revolutionary movements, was the state purchase of wheat at above-market prices, approved in 1930. Educational legislation, which in the end could not be fully implemented, also favoured a clear conservative social stratification, despite also extending literacy and technical training, complicating access to secondary and higher education for the less well-off.

Greek exports were very vulnerable to the world crisis for two main reasons: their concentration on two products (tobacco and sultanas, (Note: Tobacco overtook sultanas as the main export product in the interwar period. It was cultivated in the new territories gained from the Balkan Wars (Petmezas, 2000, p. 322).) (Note: In 1912 two thirds of Greek exports consisted of sultanas, tobacco, olive oil and wine (Basch, 1943, p. 13).) (Note: The export of agricultural products and the import of manufactured goods was characteristic of the trade of the Balkan nations (Basch, 1943, p. 11).) which accounted for 70-80 % of export earnings) and the fact that they were luxury items, expendable in times of economic depression. Both products also represented a very substantial part of the peasants' income, so that a reduction in their sales greatly affected their earnings and the national economy. Tobacco was the first item to suffer from the depression, depending very much on the situation in Germany: exports fell by more than 50 % in value. Both tobacco and sultanas also suffered from stiff competition from producers of the United States. By contrast, cereal imports, whose price had fallen more than that of Greece's main exports, became cheaper. In general, the Great Depression tended to balance the Greek trade balance and to direct foreign trade towards countries with barter agreements. (Note: Greece sold 69.4 % of its exports to countries with which it had barter trade agreements in 1935, a percentage which rose to 77.8 % in 1937 (Basch, 1943, p. 150). The same was true of imports from these countries, which grew from 48.3 % to 55.6 % in the same period (Basch, 1943, p. 150).)

The Greek government tried unsuccessfully to maintain the value of the drachma, which had to be devalued in April 1932, and abandoned the gold standard, following Venizelos' unsuccessful attempts to take out new foreign loans earlier in the year. The country suspended payments on 1 May, (Note: The measure was common to much of Eastern Europe: Bulgaria also implemented it in the spring of 1932, Yugoslavia in November 1932, Romania in January 1933 and Austria in June 1933 (Basch, 1943, p. 54).) a move that particularly affected the UK, the country's main creditor (67% of the foreign debt was in British hands). The depreciation of the drachma (55 %) (Note: Basch notes a larger fall in the value of the drachma: 50 % immediately and 57-59 % in the rest of the 1930s (Basch, 1943, p. 149).) made foreign debt repayment impossible and led to bankruptcy, which in turn limited foreign credit to Greece. The crisis put an end to the development attempts of the previous decade. It also particularly affected Macedonia, which was heavily dependent on the export of tobacco, and where many of the refugees who had settled in the area since 1923 had been harvesting. The bankruptcy also had a serious food consequence: the difficulty in paying for the country's large wheat imports, which were the main reason for the negative balance of trade. (Note: The domestic production of wheat was insufficient to meet domestic consumption, so that Greece imported ten million pounds worth of wheat (1926), at a time when the balance of trade deficit was eighteen million pounds (Ploumidis, 2013, p. 118). The trade deficit due to the import of wheat and flour accounted for 41.9 per cent of the total in 1927 (Ploumidis, 2013, p. 118).) The crisis balanced the balance of trade at the cost of a considerable reduction in imports and a decline in trade in general.

The rise in the price of foreign products and the lack of foreign currency for exports, however, favoured Greek production, which increased significantly in some sectors, such as cereals and other agricultural products, destined for the domestic market. Greek industry also grew after declining during the first years of the depression (1929-1932) at a rate of 4 % per annum and, like agriculture, it did so to supply domestic demand, not for export, and with outdated technology.

Industrial growth was very strong in 1933 and 1934, and moderated thereafter. The damage inflicted on Greek industry by the Great Depression was less than in other European countries such as Belgium or Czechoslovakia, the hardest hit by the crisis, but still significant, between 10 and 15 %. The apparent setback of the abandonment of the gold standard, the devaluation of the drachma and the suspension of payments on foreign debt was in fact the beginning of a rapid economic recovery.

Rapid growth, however, increased social tensions by favouring mainly the entrepreneurs, leaving aside part of the proletariat and the exporting areas. Social unrest grew and in 1936 the communist party won fifteen deputies. The supposed communist danger served as an excuse for the establishment of the dictatorship of General Metaxás in the summer of 1936, which had to deal with the economic and social imbalances inherited from the previous period.

=== Statist development and crisis ===
During the dictatorship, Metaxas implemented a series of social measures to alleviate unrest, such as the establishment of the Greek social security system, and encouraged domestic production by subsidising it. Agricultural production increased significantly and domestic industry continued to be supported and grew, with one of the highest averages on the continent between 1929 and 1938. Its development, however, was limited by the lack of domestic raw materials (especially minerals) and the impossibility of importing them because of the lack of foreign exchange. In 1938, three quarters of the industry's raw materials had to be imported. This perpetuated the negative balance of payments of Greek trade.

Despite improvements, on the eve of the world war 60 % of the population still depended on agriculture and about half of the cereals had to be imported. In 1938, 68 % of exports were still due to tobacco, sultanas, olives and olive oil. Farming techniques were still primitive and farm mechanisation was very low (218 labourers per tractor compared with 8 in Denmark).

Industry, despite its growth, still consisted mostly of small workshops (92% of factories with less than five employees), family businesses with little capital. The main industries were textiles and food processing, both small-scale and with obsolete technology, protected by state protectionist measures. The bulk of industrial production was for domestic consumption; the poor quality and high cost of production of Greek manufactured goods made exporting them difficult. Electricity production grew significantly, but per capita consumption remained low and many of the industries had not yet been electrified when World War II broke out.

Industrial development, partly due to protectionism, also meant paying high prices for products of lower quality than those imported. Despite the growth in production, moreover, industry, as in other countries in the region, failed to solve the problem of rural overpopulation. In 1940 industry accounted for only 18% of GDP and employed 15% of the population.

Industrial development in Greece during the interwar period (1913-1938)
Industrial development in Greece during
the interwar period (1921-1938)
Industrial production index (1921 - 1938) (Christodoulaki, 2001, 72).

The Greek merchant fleet, after suffering a very significant decline in the World War I, increased dramatically in the interwar period and was the tenth largest in the world in 1938. In 1939, it was the ninth largest in the world, and the third largest in the Mediterranean after the French and Italian ships. By the end of the decade, Germany had become Greece's largest trading partner, buying 43% of Greece's exports and supplying 31% of its imports in 1938. (Note: Kitsikis data: somewhat different: 38.5% of exports and 28.8% of imports (Kitsikis, 1967, p. 96).) Like other countries in the region, Greece had to submit to the new barter trade system favoured by the German government, which was short of foreign currency with which to pay for its imports. German debts incurred through this system were offset by armaments for Metaxas' rearmament programme. (Note: The main suppliers of tobacco to the British market in the interwar period were the United States, with almost 80 % of the total, and the imperial territories (Kitsikis, 1967, p. 95).) Dependence on Germany stemmed from the heavy burden of tobacco exports to Greece, which the United Kingdom refused to buy —as it refused to buy any Balkan tobacco—, while Germany bought more than half of Greek, Turkish and Bulgarian exports.

External debt grew steadily throughout the period, being proportionately much higher than that of neighbouring countries. Low agricultural and industrial productivity, limited foreign markets and high foreign debt meant that per capita income in Greece was very low ($75 in 1939 compared to $283 in France). The importance of indirect taxes (about 80 % of the total) further aggravated the conditions of the poorest.

Low per capita income and unequal income distribution led to malnutrition and poor sanitary conditions for a large part of the population. Both malaria and tuberculosis were widespread.

Illiteracy was also rife: 40.9% of those over the age of eight in 1928 were illiterate. Women suffered from the lack of education more acutely than men, with twice as many illiterates as men. Their numbers, however, declined rapidly in the 1930s. As in other underdeveloped countries, higher education tended to focus on the arts and the cities, with the number of applied science graduates far less than the country's needs. The lack of private initiative and the preponderance of the under-funded state made it difficult to employ technicians and encouraged the creation of a low-paid civil service.

The outbreak of the World War and the consequent rearmament decided by the government put an end to attempts to balance the budget and increased inflation. Mussolini's attack in October 1940 further worsened the economic situation.

== See also ==
- Axis occupation of Greece
- Eleftherios Venizelos
- German invasion of Greece
- Greco–Italian War
- Ioannis Metaxas
- Second Hellenic Republic

== Bibliography ==
- Armstrong, Hamilton Fish (1929). "Venizelos again supreme in Greece". Foreign Affairs. 8 (1): 120–129. doi:10.2307/20028748. JSTOR 20028748.
- Basch, Antonín (1943). The Danube basin and the German economic sphere. Columbia University Press. p. 275. OCLC 2226815.
- Borejsza, Jerzy W. (1986). Greece and the Balkan Policy of Fascist Italy, 1936-1940 (PDF). Pella Publishing Company. p. 18. hdl:10066/5462.
- Campbell, John; Sherrard, Philip (1969). Modern Greece. Ernest Benn. ISBN 9780510379513.
- Christodoulaki, Olga (2001). "Industrial growth in Greece between the wars: A new perspective". European Review of Economic History. 5 (1). Oxford University Press: 61–89. doi:10.1017/S136149160100003X – via 61-89.
- Cliadakis, Harry C. (1979). "The Political and Diplomatic Background to the Metaxas Dictatorship". Journal of Contemporary History. 14 (1): 117–138. doi:10.1177/002200947901400106. ISSN 0022-0094. JSTOR 260230.
- Higham, Robin; Veremis, Thanos (1993). The Metaxas Dictatorship: Aspects of Greece: 1936-40. Elliniko Idryma Amyntikis Kai Exoterikis Politikis. pp. 240. ISBN 9789607061140.
- Jelavich, Barbara (1999). History of the Balkans. Twentieth century. Cambridge University Press. pp. 476. ISBN 0521274591.
- Kitsikis, Dimitri (1967). "La Grèce entre l'Angleterre et l'Allemagne de 1936 à 1941". Revue Historique (in French). 238 (1): 85–116. JSTOR 40950984.
- Larsen, Stein Ugelvik; Hagtvet, Bernt; Myklebust, Jan Petter (1985). Who Were the Fascists?: Social Roots of European Fascism. Oxford University Press. p. 816. ISBN 9788200053316.
- Mavrogordatos, George Th. (1983). Stillborn republic : social coalitions and party strategies in Greece, 1922-1936. University of California Press.
- Miller, William (1929). "Greece since the return of Venizelos". Foreign Affairs. 7 (3): 468–476. doi:10.2307/20028707. JSTOR 20028707.
- — (1936). "A new era in Greece". Foreign Affairs. 14 (4): 654–661. doi:10.2307/20030766. JSTOR 20030766.
- Mouzelis, Nicos (1976). "Greek and Bulgarian Peasants: Aspects of Their Sociopolitical Situation during the Interwar Period". Comparative Studies in Society and History. 18 (1): 85–105. doi:10.1017/S0010417500008094.
- Papacosma, S. Victor (1979). The Military in Greek Politics: The 1909 Coup D'etat. Kent State Univ Press. p. 265. ISBN 9780873382083.
- — (1980). "Minority questions and problems in East European diplomacy between the world wars: The case of Greece". Nationalities Papers. 8 (1): 1–8. doi:10.1080/00905998008407873.
- Pelt, Mogens (2001). "The Establishment and Development of the Metaxas Regime in the Context of Nazi Fascism, 1936-41". Totalitarian Movements and Political Religions. 2 (3): 143–172. doi:10.1080/714005461.
- Petmezas, Socrates D. (2000). "Export-dependent Agriculture, Revenue Crisis and Agrarian Productivity Involution. The Greek Case (1860s-1930s)". Histoire & Mesure. 15 (3/4): 321–337. doi:10.3406/hism.2000.1798.
- Ploumidis, Spyridon (2013). "'Peasantist nationalism' in inter-war Greece (1927–41)". Byzantine and Modern Greek Studies. 37 (1): 111–129. doi:10.1179/0307013112Z.00000000022.
- Rizas, Sotiris (2011). "Geopolitics and Domestic Politics: Greece's Policy Towards the Great Powers During the Unravelling of the Inter-War Order, 1934-1936". Contemporary European History. 20 (2): 137–156. doi:10.1017/S0960777311000038.
- Stavrianos, L. S. (1958). The Balkans since 1453. Dryden Press. p. 970. OCLC 418969.
- Türkeş, Mustafa (1994). "The Balkan Pact and Its Immediate Implications for the Balkan States, 1930-34". Middle Eastern Studies. 30 (1): 123–144. doi:10.1080/00263209408700986. hdl:11511/46837.
- Vatikiotis, P. J. (1998). Popular autocracy in Greece, 1936-41: a political biography of general Ioannis Metaxas. Frank Cass. p. 223. ISBN 9780714644455.
- Verimis, T. (1976). "The Officer Corps in Greece (1912–1936)". Byzantine and Modern Greek Studies. 2 (1): 113–133. doi:10.1179/030701376790206162.
