= Population exchange between Greece and Turkey =

1923 agreement between Greece and Turkey

- Part of the aftermath of World War I and the Turkish War of Independence
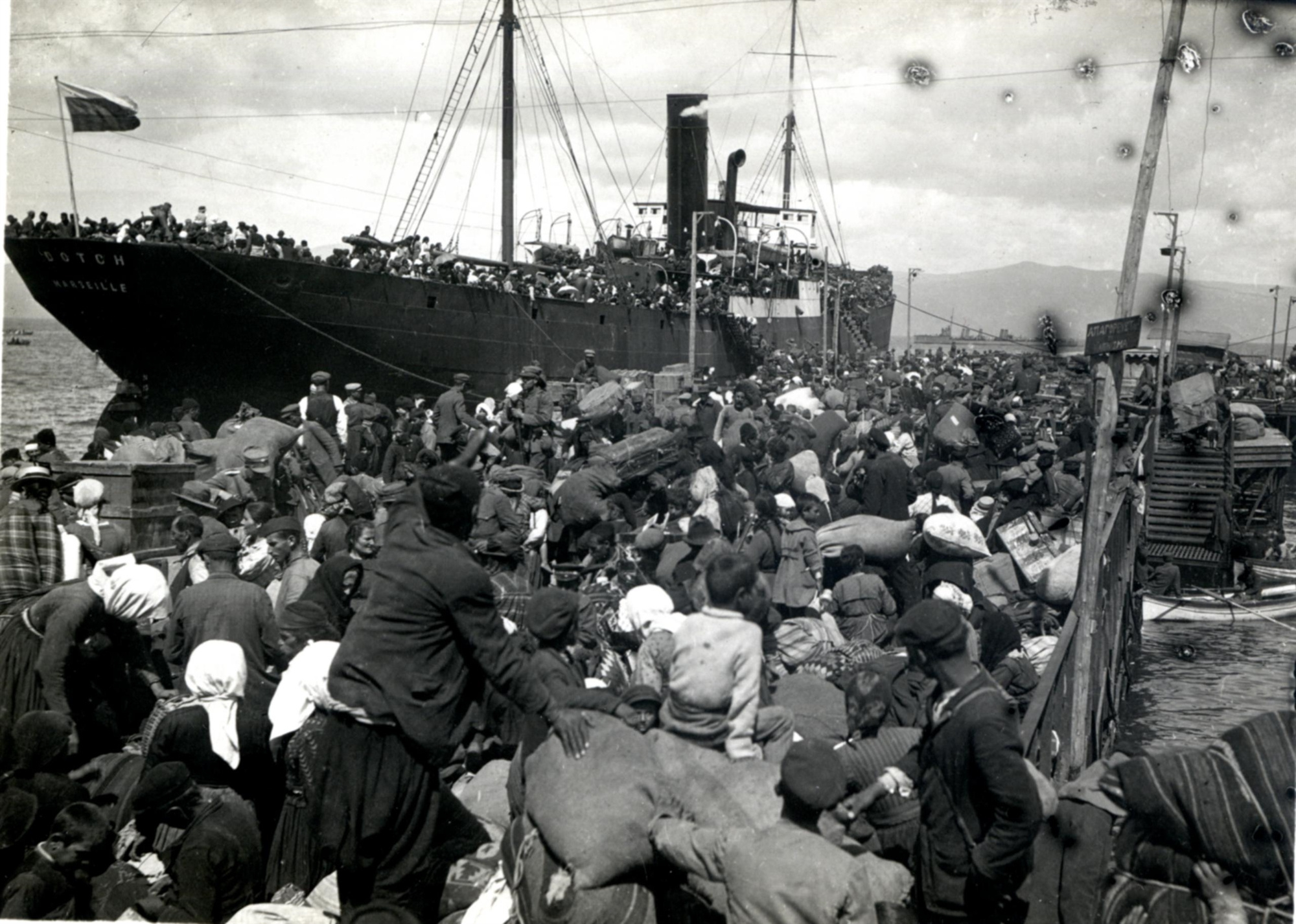
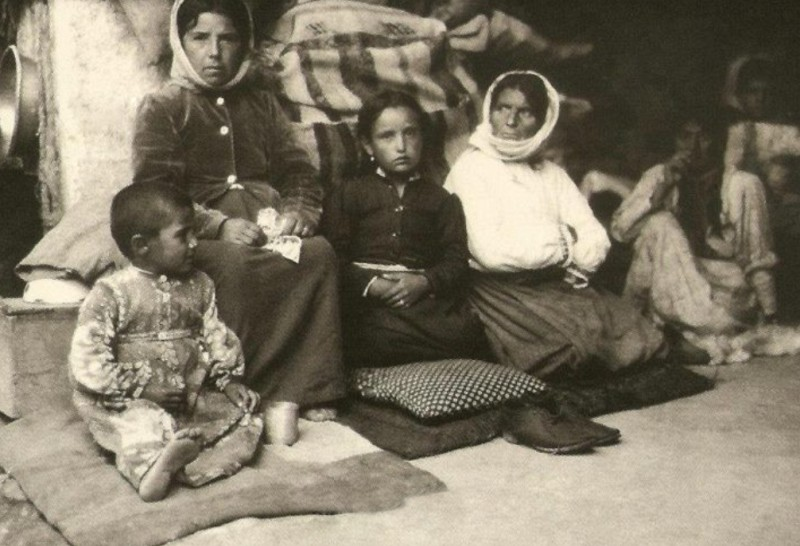
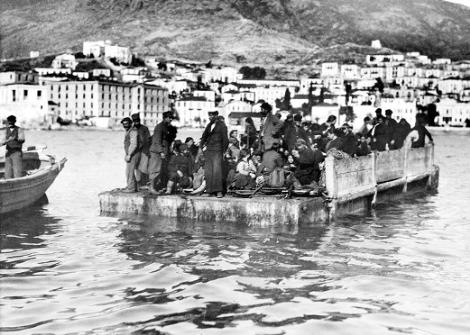
- Top: Ottoman Greek refugees at the Port of Moudania (Mudanya), August 1922. Left: Turkish muhacirs in Anatolia during the 1923 exchange. Right: Greeks from Samsun being rafted to their ships bound for Greece, 1923.
- Native name: Greek: Ελληνοτουρκική ανταλλαγή πληθυσμών Turkish: Türkiye-Yunanistan nüfus mübadelesi

The 1923 population exchange (Note: Greek: Ἡ Ἀνταλλαγή, romanized: I Antallagí; Ottoman Turkish: مبادله, romanized: Mübâdele; Turkish: Mübadele) between Greece and Turkey was the formal displacement of approximately 1,221,489 Greek Orthodox Christians from Asia Minor, Eastern Thrace, the Pontic Alps and the Caucasus, and 355,000–400,000 Muslims from Greece. Most of these people were forcibly made refugees and de jure denaturalized from their homelands. It stemmed from the "Convention Concerning the Exchange of Greek and Turkish Populations" signed at Lausanne, Switzerland, on 30 January 1923, by the governments of Greece and Turkey. Most of the Greeks covered by the agreement had already been ethnically cleansed from Turkey by late 1922, before the exchange agreement, whereas most of the Muslim population transferred from Greece departed in 1923–1924, after the exchange agreement.

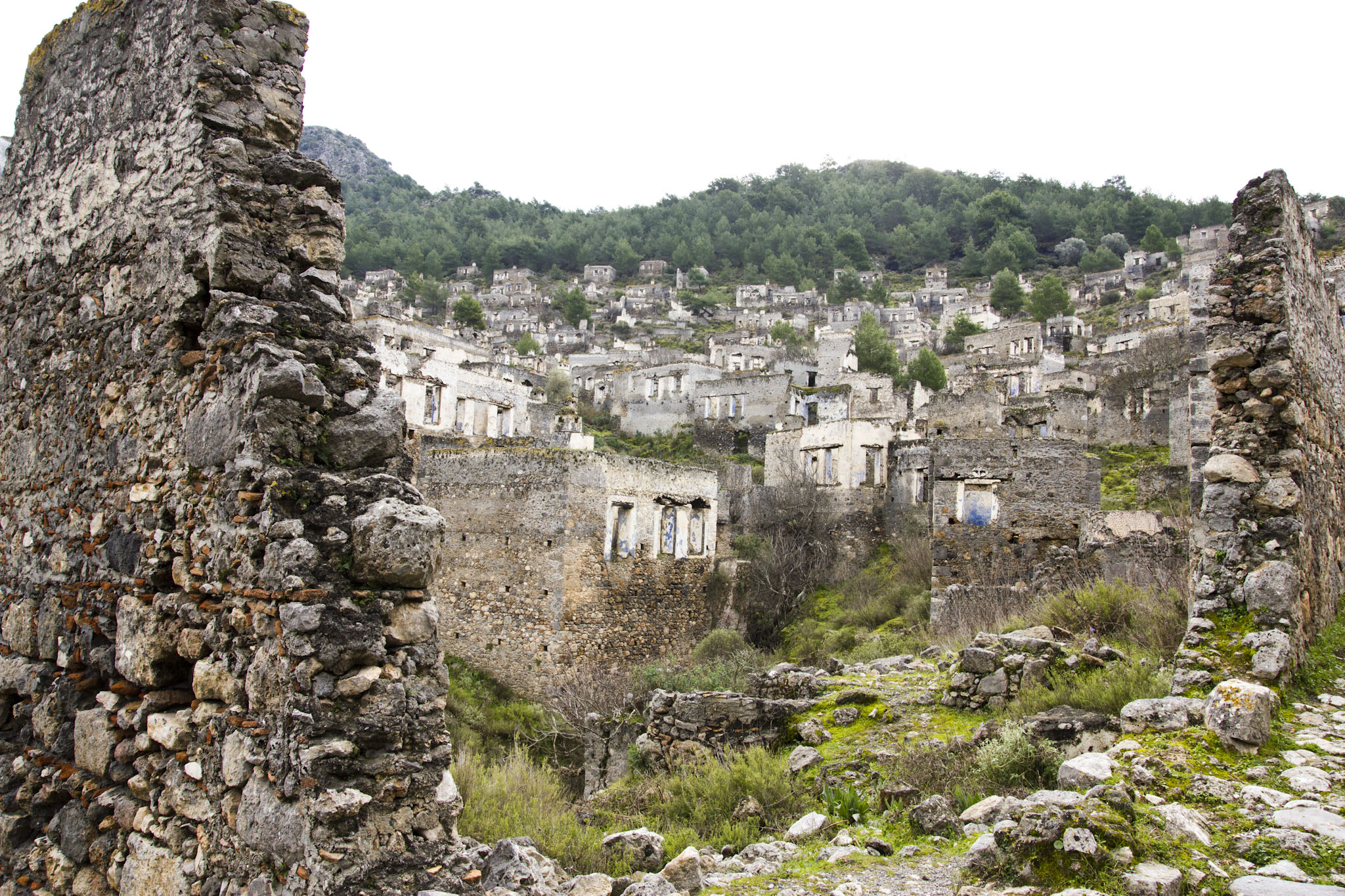
The ghost town of Kayaköy (Livisi) in southwestern Anatolia. The Greek village was abandoned during the 1923 population exchange.

On 16 March 1922, Turkish Minister of Foreign Affairs, Yusuf Kemal Bey (later Yusuf Kemal Tengirşek), stated that "[t]he Ankara Government was strongly in favour of a solution that would satisfy world opinion and ensure tranquillity in its own country", and that "[i]t was ready to accept the idea of an exchange of populations between the Greeks in Asia Minor and the Muslims in Greece". Eventually, the initial request for an exchange of population came from Eleftherios Venizelos in a letter he submitted to the League of Nations on 16 October 1922, following Greece's defeat in the Greco-Turkish War and two days after their accession of the Armistice of Mudanya. The request intended to normalize relations de jure, since the majority of surviving Greek inhabitants of Turkey had fled from recent genocidal massacres to Greece by that time already. Venizelos proposed a "compulsory exchange of Greek and Turkish populations", and asked Fridtjof Nansen to make the necessary arrangements. The new state of Turkey also envisioned the population exchange as a way to formalize and make permanent the flight of its native Greek Orthodox peoples while initiating a new exodus of a smaller number (400,000) of Muslims from Greece as a way to provide settlers for the newly depopulated Orthodox villages of Turkey. Norman M. Naimark claimed that this treaty was the last part of an ethnic cleansing campaign to create an ethnically pure homeland for the Turks. Historian Dinah Shelton similarly wrote that "the Lausanne Treaty of 1923 completed the process of the forcible transfer of the Greeks".

This compulsory population exchange, or agreed mutual expulsion, was based primarily on religious identity. It encompassed nearly all the indigenous Greek Orthodox Christians of Turkey (the Rûm or "Roman/Byzantine" millet), including Armenian-speaking Hayhurum and Turkish-speaking Karamanlides. It also included most of the native Muslim population of Greece, among them Greek-speaking Muslims such as the Vallahades and Cretan Muslims, as well as Muslim Roma groups such as the Sepečides, who were relocated to Turkey.

Some scholars have criticized the exchange, describing it as a legalized form of mutual ethnic cleansing, while others have defended it, stating that despite its negative aspects, the exchange had an overall positive outcome since it successfully prevented another potential genocide of Greek Orthodox Christians in Turkey.

== Estimated numbers ==
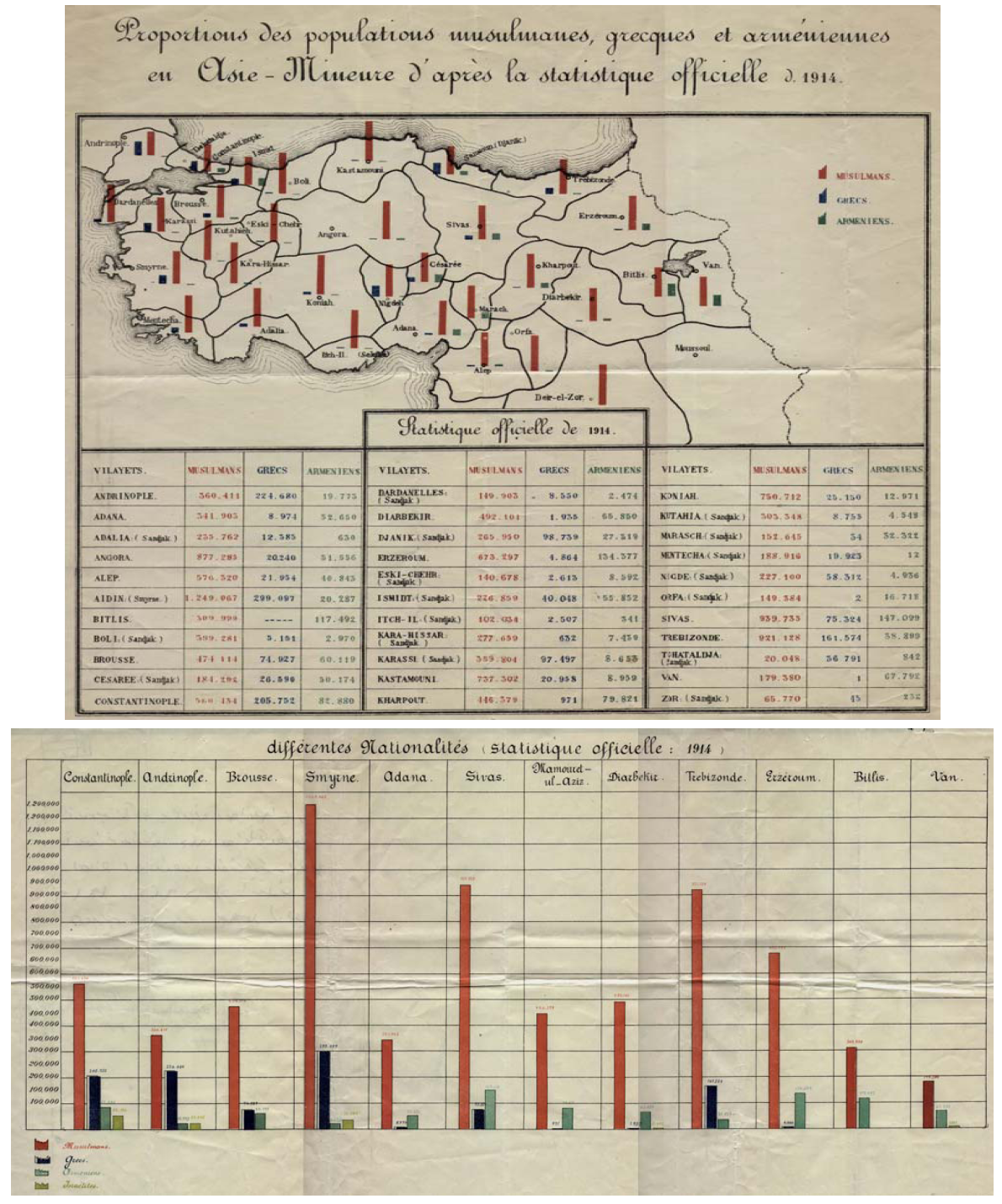
An official Ottoman document giving the results of the 1914 population census. The total population (sum of all millets) was 20,975,345, of which 1,792,206 were Greeks.

The most common estimates for Ottoman Greeks killed from 1914 to 1923 range from 300,000 to 900,000. For the whole of the period between 1914 and 1922 and for the whole of Anatolia, there are academic estimates of death toll ranging from 289,000 to 750,000. The figure of 750,000 is suggested by political scientist Adam Jones. Scholar Rudolph Rummel compiled various figures from several studies to estimate lower and higher bounds for the death toll between 1914 and 1923. He estimates that 384,000 Greeks were exterminated from 1914 to 1918, and 264,000 from 1920 to 1922, with the total number reaching 648,000. Historian Constantine G. Hatzidimitriou writes that "loss of life among Anatolian Greeks during the WWI period and its aftermath was approximately 735,370". The pre-war Greek population may have been closer to 2.4 million. The number of Armenians killed varies from 600,000 to 1.5 million. The estimate for Assyrians is 275–300,000.

According to some calculations, during the autumn of 1922, around 900,000 Greeks arrived in Greece. According to Fridtjof Nansen, before the final stage in 1922, of the 900,000 Greek refugees, a third were from Eastern Thrace, with the other two thirds being from Asia Minor.

The estimate for the Greeks living within the present-day borders of Turkey in 1914 could be as high as 2.130 million, a figure higher than the 1.8 million Greeks in the Ottoman census of 1910 which included Western Thrace, Macedonia and Epirus based on the number of Greeks who left for Greece just before World War I and the 1.3 million who arrived in the population exchanges of 1923, and the 300–900,000 estimated to have been massacred. A revised count suggests 620,000 in Eastern Thrace including Constantinople (260,000, 30% of the city's population at the time), 550,000 Pontic Greeks, 900,000 Anatolian Greeks and 60,000 Cappadocian Greeks. Arrivals in Greece from the exchange numbered 1,310,000 according to the map (in this article) with figures below: 260,000 from Eastern Thrace (100,000 had already left between 1912 and 1914 after the Balkan Wars), 20,000 from the southern shore of the Sea of Marmara, 650,000 from Anatolia, 60,000 from Cappadocia, 280,000 Pontic Greeks, 40,000 left Constantinople (the Greeks there were permitted to stay, but those who had fled during the war were not allowed to return).

Additionally, 50,000 Greeks came from the Caucasus, 50,000 from Bulgaria and 12,000 from Crimea, almost 1.42 million from all regions. About 340,000 Greeks remained in Turkey, 220,000 of them in Istanbul in 1924.

By 1924, the Christian population of Turkey proper had been reduced from 4.4 million in 1912 to 700,000 (50% of the pre-war Christians had been killed), 350,000 Armenians, 50,000 Assyrians and the rest Greeks, 70% in Constantinople; and by 1927 to 350,000, mostly in Istanbul. In modern times the percentage of Christians in Turkey has declined from 20 to 25 percent in 1914 to 3–5.5 percent in 1927, to 0.3–0.4% today roughly translating to 200,000–320,000 devotees. This was due to events that had a significant impact on the country's demographic structure, such as the First World War, the genocide of Assyrians, Greeks, and Armenians, and the population exchange between Greece and Turkey in 1923.

== Historical background ==
The Greek–Turkish population exchange came out of the Turkish and Greek militaries' treatment of the Christian minorities and Muslim majorities, respectively, in Asia Minor during the Greco-Turkish War (1919–1922) that followed the Allied Powers' authorization of a Greek zone of occupation in the defeated Ottoman Empire. This Greek occupation was designed to protect remaining Christian minorities, who had been massacred repeatedly in the Ottoman Empire before and during World War I: Adana massacre of 1909, Armenian genocide of 1914–1923, Greek genocide 1914–1922. But, instead, it unleashed further massacres both of these Christians and now also of Muslims as both armies sought to secure their rule by eliminating any inhabitants whose existence could justify unfavorable borders. This continued, now in both directions, a process of ethnic cleansing in Asia Minor that had been conducted initially by the Ottoman state against its minorities during World War I. On January 31, 1917, the Chancellor of Germany, allied with the Ottomans during World War I, was reporting that:

The indications are that the Turks plan to eliminate the Greek element as enemies of the state, as they did earlier with the Armenians. The strategy implemented by the Turks is of displacing people to the interior without taking measures for their survival by exposing them to death, hunger, and illness. The abandoned homes are then looted and burnt or destroyed. Whatever was done to the Armenians is being repeated with the Greeks.

— Chancellor of Germany in 1917, Theobald von Bethmann Hollweg, The Killing Trap: Genocide in the Twentieth Century

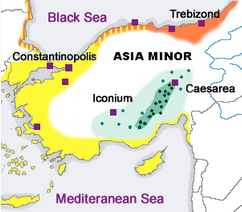
Distribution of Anatolian Greeks in 1910: Demotic Greek speakers in yellow, Pontic Greek speakers in orange, and Cappadocian Greek speakers in green. Towns are shown as dots, and cities as squares.

At the end of World War I one of the Ottomans' foremost generals, Mustafa Kemal Atatürk, continued the fight against the attempted Allied occupation of Asia Minor in the Turkish War of Independence. The surviving Christian minorities within Turkey, particularly the Armenians and the Greeks, had sought protection from the Allies and thus continued to be seen as an internal problem, and as an enemy, by the Turkish National Movement. This was exacerbated by the Allies authorizing Greece to occupy Ottoman regions (Occupation of Smyrna) with a large surviving Greek population in 1919 and by an Allied proposal to protect the remaining Armenians by creating an independent state for them (Wilsonian Armenia) within the former Ottoman realm. The Turkish Nationalists' reaction to these events led directly to the Greco-Turkish War (1919–1922) and the continuation of the Armenian genocide and Greek genocide. By the time of Mustafa Kemal Atatürk's capture of Smyrna in September 1922, over a million Greek orthodox Ottoman subjects had fled their homes in Turkey. A formal peace agreement was signed with Greece after months of negotiations in Lausanne on July 24, 1923. Two weeks after the treaty, the Allied Powers turned over Istanbul to the Nationalists, marking the final departure of occupation armies from Anatolia and provoking another flight of Christian minorities to Greece.

On October 29, 1923, the Grand Turkish National Assembly announced the creation of the Republic of Turkey, a state that would encompass most of the territories claimed by Mustafa Kemal in his National Pact of 1920.

The state of Turkey was headed by Mustafa Kemal's People's Party, which later became the Republican People's Party. The end of the War of Independence brought new administration to the region, but also brought new problems considering the demographic reconstruction of cities and towns, many of which had been abandoned by fleeing minority Christians. The Greco-Turkish War left many of the settlements plundered and in ruins.

Meanwhile, after the Balkan Wars, Greece had almost doubled its territory, and the population of the state had risen from approximately 3.7 million to 4.8 million. With this newly annexed population, the proportion of non-Greek minority groups in Greece rose to 13%, and following the end of the First World War, it had increased to 20%. Most of the ethnic populations in these annexed territories were Muslim, but were not necessarily Turkish in ethnicity. This is particularly true in the case of ethnic Albanians who inhabited the Çamëria (Greek: Τσαμουριά) region of Epirus. During the deliberations held at Lausanne, the question of exactly who was Greek, Turkish or Albanian was routinely brought up. Greek and Albanian representatives determined that the Albanians in Greece, who mostly lived in the northwestern part of the state, were not all mixed, and were distinguishable from the Turks. The government in Ankara still expected a thousand "Turkish-speakers" from the Çamëria to arrive in Turkey for settlement in Erdek, Ayvalık, Menteşe, Antalya, Senkile, Mersin, and Adana. Ultimately, the Greek authorities decided to deport thousands of Muslims from Thesprotia, Larissa, Langadas, Drama, Edessa, Serres, Florina, Kilkis, Kavala, and Thessaloniki. Between 1923 and 1930, the infusion of these refugees into Turkey would dramatically alter Anatolian society. By 1927, Turkish officials had settled 32,315 individuals from Greece in the province of Bursa alone.

== The road to the exchange ==
According to some sources, the population exchange, albeit messy and dangerous for many, was executed fairly quickly by respected supervisors. If the goal of the exchange was to ostensibly achieve religious homogeneity, then this was achieved by both Turkey and Greece. For example, in 1906, nearly 20 percent of the population of present-day Turkey was non-Muslim, but by 1927, only 2.6 percent was.

The architect of the exchange was Fridtjof Nansen, commissioned by the League of Nations. As the first official high commissioner for refugees, Nansen proposed and supervised the exchange, taking into account the interests of Greece, Turkey, and West European powers. As an experienced diplomat with experience resettling Russian and other refugees after the First World War, Nansen had also created a new travel document for displaced persons of the World War in the process. He was chosen to be in charge of the peaceful resolution of the Greek-Turkish war of 1919–22. Although a compulsory exchange on this scale had never been attempted in modern history, Balkan precedents, such as the Greek–Bulgarian population exchange of 1919, were available. Because of the unanimous decision by the Greek and Turkish governments that minority protection would not suffice to ameliorate ethnic tensions after the First World War, population exchange was promoted as the only viable option.

According to representatives from Ankara, the "amelioration of the lot of the minorities in Turkey' depended 'above all on the exclusion of every kind of foreign intervention and of the possibility of provocation coming from outside'. This could be achieved most effectively with an exchange, and 'the best guarantees for the security and development of the minorities remaining' after the exchange 'would be those supplied both by the laws of the country and by the liberal policy of Turkey with regard to all communities whose members have not deviated from their duty as Turkish citizens'. An exchange would also be useful as a response to violence in the Balkans; 'there were', in any event, 'over a million Turks without food or shelter in countries in which neither Europe nor America took nor was willing to take any interest'.

The population exchange was seen as the best form of minority protection as well as "the most radical and humane remedy" of all. Nansen believed that what was on the negotiating table at Lausanne was not ethno-nationalism, but rather, a "question" that "demanded 'quick and efficient' resolution without a minimum of delay." He believed that economic component of the problem of Greek and Turkish refugees deserved the most attention: "Such an exchange will provide Turkey immediately and in the best conditions with the population necessary to continue the exploitation of the cultivated lands which the departed Greek populations have abandoned. The departure from Greece of its Muslim citizens would create the possibility of rendering self-supporting a great proportion of the refugees now concentrated in the towns and in different parts of Greece". Nansen recognized that the difficulties were truly "immense", acknowledging that the population-exchange would require "the displacement of populations of many more than 1,000,000 people". He advocated: "uprooting these people from their homes, transferring them to a strange new country, ... registering, valuing and liquidating their individual property which they abandon, and ... securing to them the payment of their just claims to the value of this property".

The agreement promised that the possessions of the refugees would be protected and allowed migrants to carry "portable" belongings freely with themselves. It was required that possessions not carried across the Aegean Sea be recorded in lists; these lists were to be submitted to both governments for reimbursement. After a commission was established to deal with the particular issue of belongings (mobile and immobile) of the populations, this commission would decide the total sum to pay persons for their immovable belongings (houses, cars, land, etc.) It was also promised that in their new settlement, the refugees would be provided with new possessions totaling the ones they had left behind. Greece and Turkey would calculate the total value of a refugee's belongings and the country with a surplus would pay the difference to the other country. All possessions left in Greece belonged to the Greek state and all the possessions left in Turkey belonged to the Turkish state. Because of the difference in nature and numbers of the populations, the possessions left behind by the Greek elite of the economic classes in Anatolia was greater than the possessions of the Muslim farmers in Greece.

== Refugee camps ==
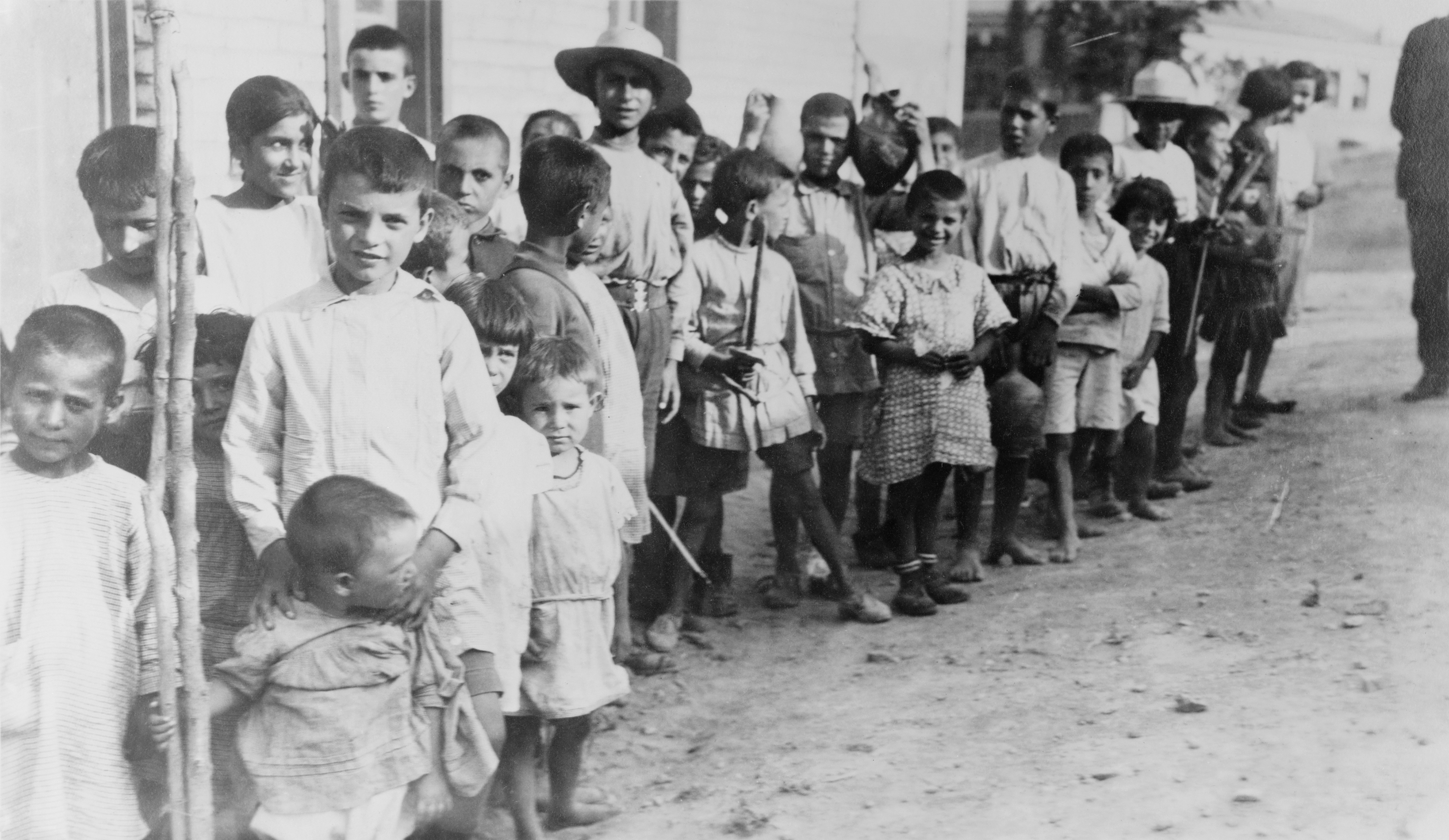
Greek and Armenian refugee children in Athens

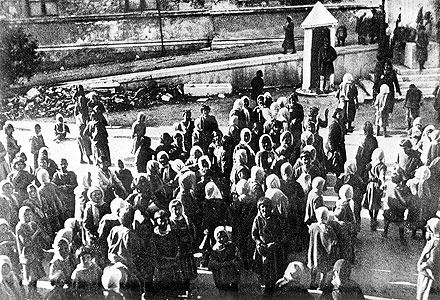
Muslim refugees

The Refugee Commission had no useful plan to follow to resettle the refugees. Having arrived in Greece for the purpose of settling the refugees on land, the commission had no statistical data either about the number of the refugees or the number of available acres. When the Commission arrived in Greece, the Greek government had already settled provisionally 72,581 farming families, almost entirely in Macedonia, where the houses abandoned by the exchanged Muslims and the fertility of the land made their establishment practicable and auspicious.

In Turkey, the property abandoned by the Greeks was often looted by arriving immigrants before the influx of immigrants of the population exchange. As a result, it was quite difficult to settle refugees in Anatolia, since many of these homes had been occupied by people displaced by war before the government could seize them.

== Political and economic effects of the exchange ==
The more than 1,250,000 refugees who left Turkey for Greece, through different mechanisms, contributed to the unification of elites under authoritarian regimes in Turkey and Greece. In Turkey, the departure of the independent and strong economic elites, i.e. the Greek Orthodox populations, left the dominant state elites unchallenged. In fact, Caglar Keyder noted that "what this drastic measure [Greek-Turkish population exchange] indicates is that during the war years Turkey lost ... [around 90 percent of the pre-war] commercial class, such that when the Republic was formed, the bureaucracy found itself unchallenged". The emerging business groups that supported the Free Republican Party in 1930 could not prolong the rule of a single-party without an opposition. Transition to multiparty politics depended on the creation of stronger economic groups in the mid-1940s, which was stifled due to the exodus of the Greek middle and upper economic classes. Hence, if the groups of Orthodox Christians had stayed in Turkey after the formation of the nation-state, then there would have been a faction of society ready to challenge the emergence of single-party rule in Turkey. Although it is very unlikely that an opposition based on an economic elite made up of an ethnic and religious minority would have been accepted as a legitimate political party by the majority population.

In Greece, contrary to Turkey, the arrival of the refugees broke the dominance of the monarchy and old politicians relative to the Republicans. In the elections of the 1920s most of the newcomers supported Eleftherios Venizelos. In December 1916, during the Noemvriana, refugees from an earlier wave of persecution in the Ottoman Empire had been attacked by royalist troops as Venizelists, which contributed to the perception in the 1920s that the Venizelist side of the National Schism was much friendlier to refugees from Anatolia than the royalist side. For their political stance and their "Anatolian customs" (cuisine, music, etc.), the refugees often faced discrimination by part of the local Greek population. The fact that the refugees spoke dialects of Greek that sounded exotic and strange in Greece marked them out, and they were often seen as rivals by the locals for land and jobs. The arrival of so many people in so short a period of time imposed significant costs on the Greek economy such as building housing and schools, importing enough food, providing health care, etc. Greece needed a 12,000,000 franc loan from the Refugee Settlement Commission of the League of Nations as there was not enough money in the Greek treasury to handle these costs. Increasing the problems was the Immigration Act of 1924 passed by the U.S. Congress, which sharply limited the number of immigrants the United States was willing to take annually, which removed one of the traditional "safety valves" that Greece had in periods of high unemployment. In the 1920s, the refugees, most of whom went to Greek Macedonia, were known for their staunch loyalty to Venizelism. According to the 1928 census 45% of the population in Macedonia were refugees, while the figure was 35% in Greek Thrace, 19% in Athens, and 18% in the islands of the Aegean Sea; overall, the census showed that 1,221,849 people or 20% of the Greek population were refugees.

The majority of the refugees who settled in cities like Thessaloniki and Athens were deliberately placed by the authorities in shantytowns on the outskirts of the cities in order to subject them to police control. The refugee communities in the cities were seen by the authorities as centers of poverty and crime that might also become centers of social unrest. About 50% of the refugees were settled in urban areas. Regardless of whether they settled in urban or rural areas, the vast majority of the refugees arrived in Greece impoverished and often sickly, placing enormous demands on the Greek health care system. Tensions between locals and the refugees for jobs sometimes turned violent, and in 1924, the Interior Minister, General Georgios Kondylis, used a force of refugees as strike-breakers. In rural areas, there were demands that the land that once belonged to the Muslims that had been expelled should go to veterans instead of the refugees. Demagogic politicians quite consciously stoked tensions, portraying refugees as a parasitical class who by their very existence were overwhelming public services, as a way to gain votes.

As the largest number of refugees were settled in Macedonia, which was part of the "new Greece" (i.e. the areas gained after the Balkan Wars of 1912–13), they shared in the resentment against the way that men from "Old Greece" (i.e. the pre-1912 Kingdom of Greece) dominated politics, the civil service, judiciary, etc., and tended to treat "new Greece" like it was a conquered country. In general, people from "Old Greece" tended to be more royalist in their sympathies while people from "new Greece" tended to be more Venizelist. The fact that in 1916 King Constantine I had contemplated giving up "new "Greece" to Bulgaria as a way of weakening the Venizelist movement had greatly increased the hostility felt in "new Greece" towards the House of Glücksburg. Furthermore, the fact that it was under King Constantine's leadership that Greece had been defeated in 1922 together with the indifference shown by Greek authorities in Smyrna (modern İzmir, Turkey) towards rescuing the threatened Greek communities of Anatolia in the last stages of the war cemented the hatred of the refugees towards the monarchy. Aristeidis Stergiadis, the Greek High Commissioner in Smyrna remarked in August 1922 as the Turkish Army advanced upon the city: "Better that they stay here and be slain by Kemal [Ataturk], because if they go to Athens they will overthrow everything".

However, increasing grievances of the refugees caused some of the immigrants to shift their allegiance to the Communist Party and contributed to its increasing strength. The impoverished slum districts of Thessaloniki where the refugees were concentrated became strongholds of the Greek Communist Party in the Great Depression together with the rural areas of Macedonia where tobacco farming was the main industry. In May 1936, a strike of the tobacco farmers in Macedonia organized by the Communists led to a rebellion that saw the government lose control of Thessaloniki for a time. Prime Minister Ioannis Metaxas, with the support of the King, responded to the communists by establishing an authoritarian regime in 1936, the 4th of August Regime. In these ways, the population exchange indirectly facilitated changes in the political regimes of Greece and Turkey during the interwar period.

Many immigrants died of epidemic illnesses during the voyage and brutal waiting for boats for transportation. The death rate during the immigration was four times higher than the birth rate. In the first years after their arrival, the Turkish immigrants from Greece were inefficient in economic production, having only brought with them agricultural skills in tobacco production. This created considerable economic loss in Anatolia for the new Turkish Republic. On the other hand, the Greek populations that left were skilled workers who engaged in transnational trade and business, as per previous capitulations policies of the Ottoman Empire.

== Effect on other ethnic populations ==
While current scholarship defines the Greek-Turkish population exchange in terms of religious identity, the population exchange was much more complex than this. Indeed, the population exchange, embodied in the Convention Concerning the Exchange of Greek and Turkish Populations at the Lausanne Conference of January 30, 1923, was based on ethnic identity.

The population exchange made it legally possible for both Turkey and Greece to cleanse their ethnic minorities in the formation of the nation-state. Nonetheless, religion was utilized as a legitimizing factor or a "safe criterion" in marking ethnic groups as Turkish or as Greek in the population exchange. As a result, the Greek-Turkish population exchange did exchange the Greek Orthodox population of Anatolia, Turkey and the Muslim population of Greece. However, due to the heterogeneous nature of these former Ottoman lands, many other ethnic groups posed social and legal challenges to the terms of the agreement for years after its signing. Among these were the Protestant and Catholic Greeks, the Arabs, Albanians, Russians, Serbs, Romanians of the Greek Orthodox religion; the Albanian, Bulgarian, Greek Muslims of Epirus, and the Turkish-speaking Greek Orthodox.

In Thessaloniki, which had the largest Jewish population in the Balkans, competition emerged between the Sephardic Jews who spoke Ladino and the refugees for jobs and businesses. Owing to an increase in antisemitism, many of the Jews of Thessaloniki became Zionists and immigrated to the Palestine Mandate in the interwar period. Because the refugees tended to vote for the Venizelist Liberals, the Jews and remaining Muslims in Thrace and Macedonia tended to vote for the anti-Venizelist parties. A group of refugee merchants in Thessaloniki founded the republican and anti-Semitic EEE (Ethniki Enosis Ellados-National Union of Greece) party in 1927 to press for the removal of the Jews from the city, whom they saw as economic competitors. However, the EEE never became a major party, though its members did collaborate with the Germans in World War II, serving in the Security Battalions.

The heterogeneous nature of the groups under the nation-state of Greece and Turkey is not reflected in the establishment of criteria formed in the Lausanne negotiations. This is evident in the first article of the Convention which states: "As from 1st May, 1923, there shall take place a compulsory exchange of Turkish nationals of the Greek Orthodox religion established in Turkish territory, and of Greek nationals of the Moslem religion established in Greek territory." The agreement defined the groups subject to exchange as Muslim and Greek Orthodox. This classification follows the lines drawn by the millet system of the Ottoman Empire. In the absence of rigid national definitions, there was no readily available criteria to yield to an official ordering of identities after centuries long coexistence in a non-national order.

== Displacements ==
The Treaty of Sèvres imposed harsh terms upon Turkey and placed most of Anatolia under de facto Allied and Greek control. Sultan Mehmet VI's acceptance of the treaty angered Turkish nationalists, who established a rival government at Ankara and reorganized Turkish forces with the aim of blocking the implementation of the treaty, waging the Turkish War of Independence. By the fall of 1922, the Ankara Government had secured most of Turkey's contemporary borders and replaced the Ottoman Sultanate as the dominant governing entity in Anatolia. Following these events, a peace conference was convened at Lausanne, Switzerland, in order to draft a new treaty to replace the Treaty of Sèvres. Invitations to participate in the conference were extended to both the Ankara Government and the Istanbul-based Ottoman Government, but the abolition of the Sultanate by the Ankara Government on 1 November 1922 and the subsequent departure of Mehmet VI from Turkey left the Ankara Government as the sole governing entity in Anatolia.

The Ankara Government, led by Mustafa Kemal Atatürk, moved swiftly to implement its nationalist programme, which did not allow for the presence of significant non-Turkish minorities in Western Anatolia. In one of his first diplomatic acts as the sole governing representative of Turkey, Atatürk negotiated and signed the "Convention Concerning the Exchange of Greek and Turkish Populations" on 30 January 1923 with Eleftherios Venizelos and the government of Greece. Under Article 3, the convention applied retrospectively to Greeks and Muslims who had emigrated since 18 October 1912, the date of the declaration of the First Balkan War, as well as to those subsequently transferred.

However, by the time the agreement was to take effect on 1 May 1923, most of the pre-war Greek population of Aegean Turkey had already fled. The exchange involved the remaining Greeks of central Anatolia (both Greek- and Turkish-speaking), Pontus and the Caucasus (Kars region). The Mixed Commission recorded about 190,000 Greeks transferred under the formal exchange, compared with approximately 355,000 Muslims from Greece.

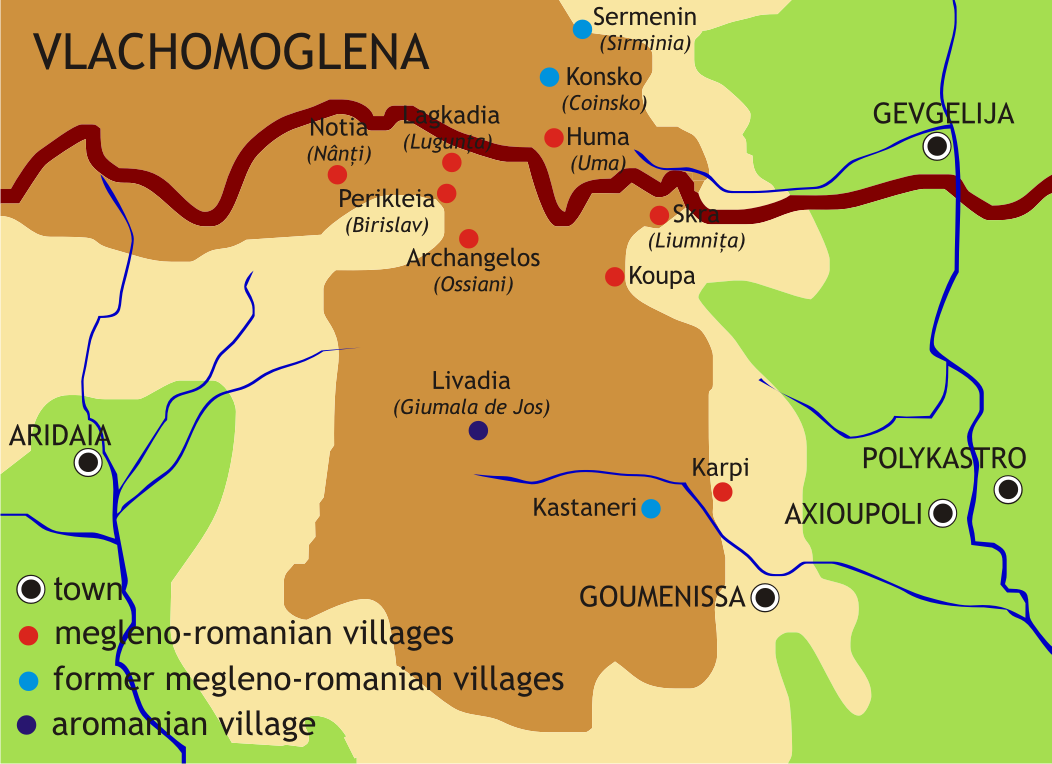
Map of the settlements where the Megleno-Romanians live today. In Greece, near the border with North Macedonia, is the village of Notia. The vast majority of the population of Notia was sent to Turkey following the population exchange. Today, the population of this community is approximately 5,000 people in Turkey.

In Greece, the population exchange was considered part of the events called the Asia Minor Catastrophe (Greek: Μικρασιατική καταστροφή). Significant refugee displacement and population movements had already occurred following the Balkan Wars, World War I, and the Turkish War of Independence. The convention affected the populations as follows: almost all Greek Orthodox Christians (Greek- or Turkish-speaking) of Asia Minor including the Greek Orthodox populations from middle Anatolia (Cappadocian Greeks), the Ionia region (e.g. Smyrna, Aivali), the Pontus region (e.g. Trabzon, Samsun), the former Russian Caucasus province of Kars (Kars Oblast), Prusa (Bursa), the Bithynia region (e.g., Nicomedia (İzmit), Chalcedon (Kadıköy), East Thrace, and other regions were either expelled or formally denaturalized from Turkish territory.

On the other hand, the Muslim population in Greece not having been affected by the recent Greek–Turkish conflict was almost intact. Thus c. 354,647 Muslims moved to Turkey after the agreement.

For both communities, the population exchange had traumatic psychological effects. Professor Ayse Lahur Kirtunc, a Cretan Muslim expelled to Turkey stated in an interview: "It's late for us to be preserving our recollections; The essence of them, the first essence, has vanished already. Those first migrants took away their memories; the memories that ought to have been recorded without delay. Eighty years have passed, and the memories are warring with another, ripe for distortion. But the core of every migrant's statement remains the same. Birth in one place, growing old in another place. And feeling a stranger in the two places".

== Aftermath ==
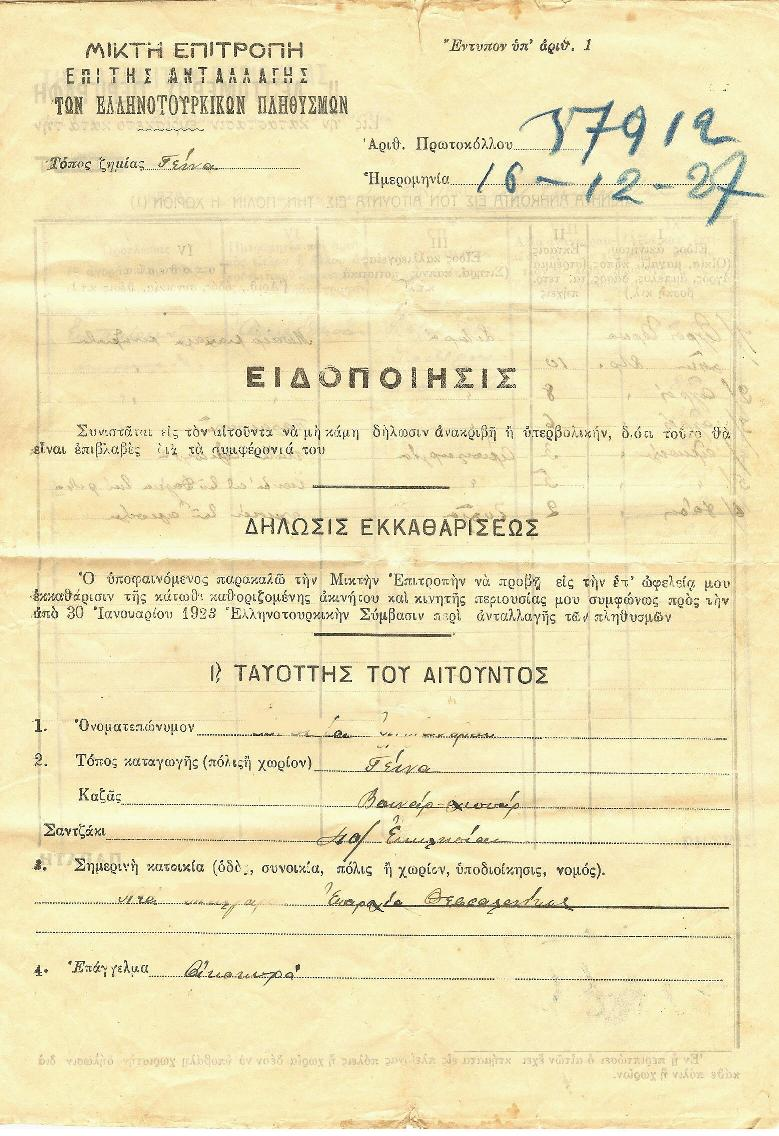
Declaration of Property during the Greek-Turkish population exchange from Yena (Kaynarca) to Thessaloniki (16 December 1927)

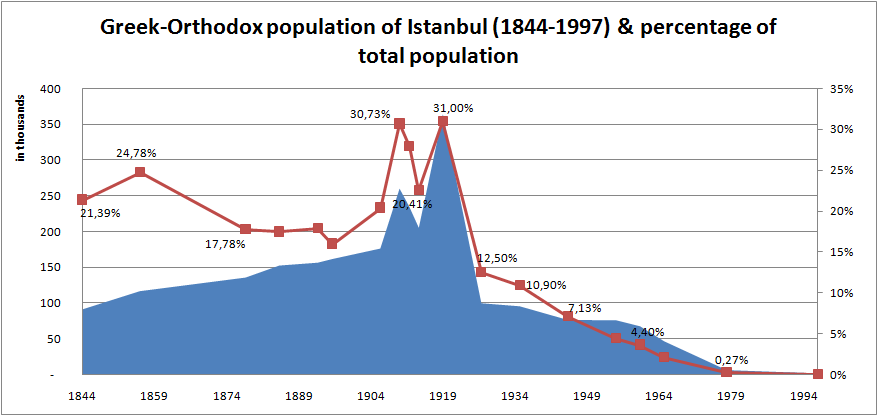
Greek population in Istanbul and percentages of the city population (1844–1997). Pogroms and policies in Turkey led virtually to the exodus of the remaining Greek community.

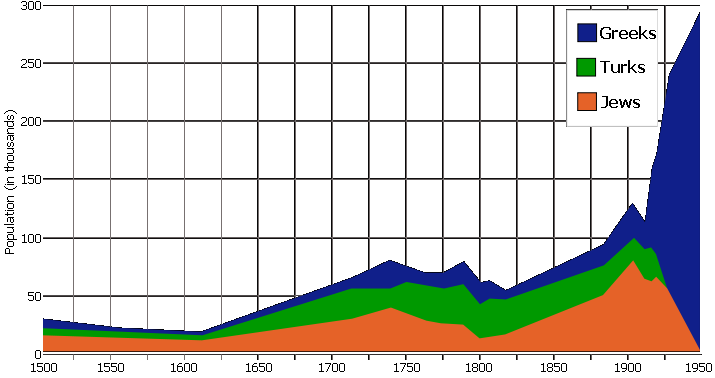
Demographics of Thessaloniki between 1500 and 1950

The Turks and other Muslims of Western Thrace were exempted from this transfer as were the Greeks of Constantinople (Istanbul) and the Aegean Islands of Imbros (Gökçeada) and Tenedos (Bozcaada). In the event, those Greeks who had temporarily fled these regions, particularly Istanbul, before the entrance of the Turkish army were not permitted to return to their homes by Turkey afterwards.

Greece, with a population of just over 5,000,000 people, had to absorb 1,221,489 new citizens from Turkey.

The punitive measures carried out by the Republic of Turkey, such as the 1932 parliamentary law which barred Greek citizens in Turkey from a series of 30 trades and professions from tailor and carpenter to medicine, law, and real estate, correlated with a reduction in the Greek population of Istanbul, and of that of Imbros and Tenedos.

Most property abandoned by Greeks who were subject to the population exchange was confiscated by the Turkish government by declaring them "abandoned" and therefore state owned. Properties were confiscated arbitrarily by labeling the former owners as "fugitives" under the court of law. Additionally, real property of many Greeks was declared "unclaimed" and ownership was subsequently assumed by the state. Consequently, the greater part of the Greeks' real property was sold at nominal value by the Turkish government. Sub-committees that operated under the framework of the Committee for Abandoned properties had undertaken the verification of persons to be exchanged in order to continue the task of selling abandoned property.

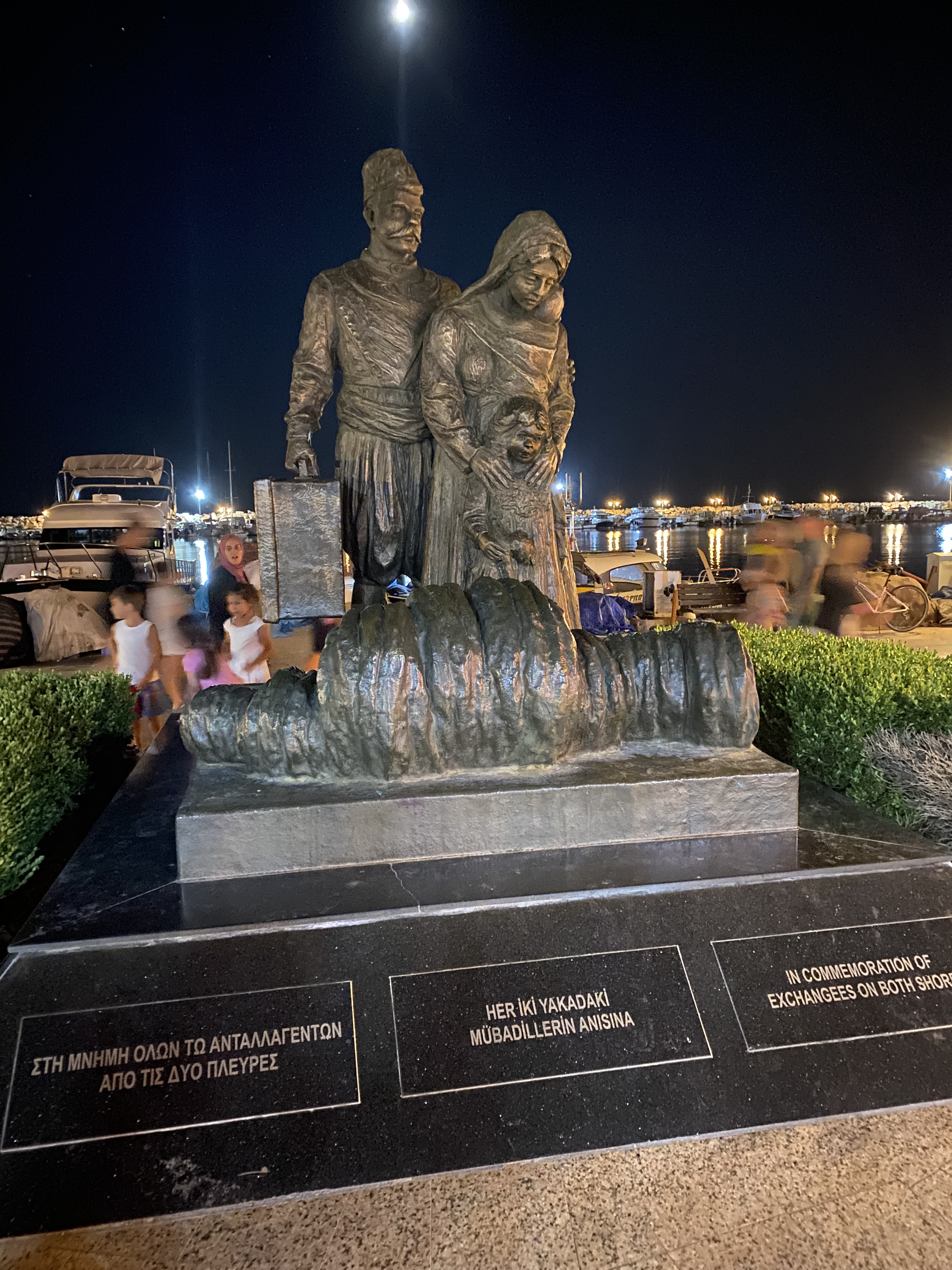
Monument to the exchange of populations located in Küçükkuyu, Ayvacık, Turkey

The Varlık Vergisi capital gains tax imposed in 1942 on wealthy non-Muslims in Turkey, also served to reduce the economic potential of ethnic Greek business people in Turkey. Furthermore, violent incidents such as the Istanbul Pogrom (1955) directed primarily against the ethnic Greek community, and against the Armenian and Jewish minorities, greatly accelerated emigration of Greeks, reducing the 200,000-strong Greek minority in 1924 to just over 2,500 in 2006. The 1955 Istanbul Pogrom and the 1964 expulsion of Istanbul Greeks caused most of the Greek inhabitants remaining in Istanbul to flee to Greece.

The population profile of Crete was significantly altered as well. Greek- and Turkish-speaking Muslim inhabitants of Crete moved, principally to the Anatolian coast, but also to Syria, Lebanon, and Egypt. Conversely, Greeks from Asia Minor, principally Smyrna, arrived in Crete bringing in their distinctive dialects, customs, and cuisine.

According to Bruce Clark, leaders of Greece and Turkey, and some circles in the international community, saw the resulting ethnic homogenization of their respective states as positive and stabilizing since it helped strengthen the nation-state natures of these two states. Nevertheless, the deportations brought significant challenges: social, such as forcibly being removed from one's place of living, and more practical such as abandoning a well-developed family business. Countries also faced other practical challenges: for example, even decades after, one could notice certain hastily developed parts of Athens, residential areas that had been quickly erected on a budget while receiving the fleeing Asia Minor population. To this day, Greece and Turkey still have properties, and ghost villages such as Kayaköy, that have been left abandoned since the exchange.

Nazi-era publications portrayed the Greco-Turkish population exchange as a means of resolving what they described as the "minority problem" and praised the resulting ethnic homogenization of Turkey. Some Nazi writers portrayed the removal of Greeks and Armenians from Anatolia as a precondition for the success of the Turkish nation-state. It is widely acknowledged that the Greco-Turkish population exchange was a model for Hitler himself, and formed part of the population policies discussed in Nazi Germany. The Lausanne Treaty was explicitly cited as a precedent for the South Tyrol Option Agreement in 1939 between Nazi Germany and Fascist Italy.

== See also ==
- Caucasus Greeks
- Constantinople pogroms
- Cyprus problem
- Fire of Manisa
- Greeks in Turkey
- Human rights in Turkey
- Human rights in Greece
- Muhacir
- Outline of the Greek genocide

== Sources ==
- Jones, Adam (2010) [2006], Genocide: A Comprehensive Introduction, Taylor & Francis, ISBN 978-0-415-48618-7
