= Ioannis Drosopoulos =

Greek economist

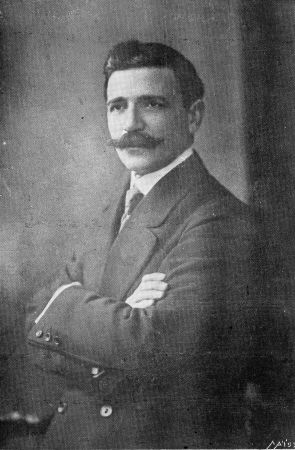
Ioannis Drosopoulos in the Panhellenic Album of the National Centennial 1821-1921 (1921)

Ioannis A. Drosopoulos (Greek: Ιωάννης Α. Δροσόπουλος; Sourpi, Magnesia, 24 July [O.S. 12 July] 1864 – Athens, 27 July 1939) was a Greek economist who acted as Subgovernor and Governor of the National Bank of Greece.

== Biography ==
He was hired in the National Bank at a young age and worked in it for thirty two years in total. In 1911 he was promoted to the position of General Inspector, and then to that of Director and in 1914 was elected Subgovernor. In 1928 he became Governor of the Bank of Greece, a position in which he remained until his death.

He was one of the first settlers of Ekali.

He died on 27 July 1939 in Athens. Athanasios Drosopoulos was his son.

== Sources ==
- Πανελλήνιον Λεύκωμα Εθνικής Εκατονταετηρίδος 1821-1921 : Η χρυσή βίβλος του ελληνισμού. Τόμος Α' Οικονομολογικά. Athens: Ν. Σηφάκης και Ι. Χατζηιωάννου. 1921.
