= Athanasios Fragkou =

Greek military officer (1864–1923)

- Αθανάσιος Φράγκου
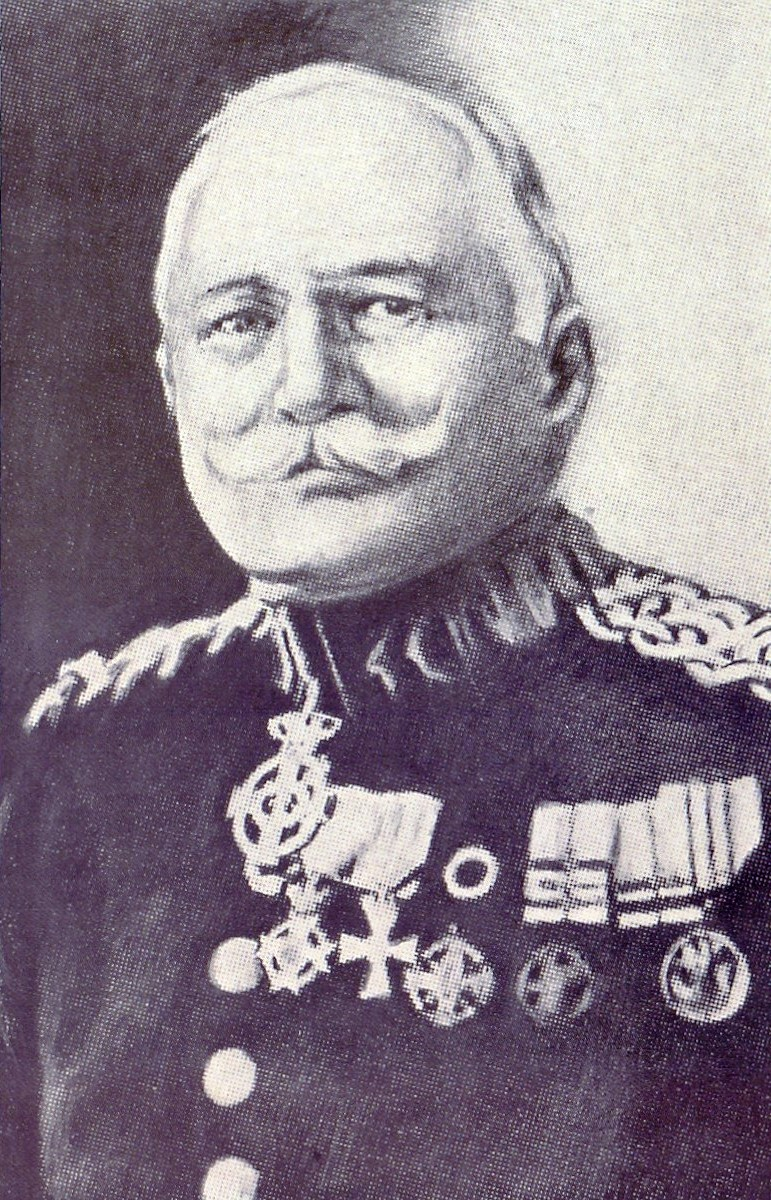
- Athanasios Fragkou c. 1923
- Born: 1 January 1864; Sourpi, Sanjak of Trikala, Ottoman Empire (now Greece)
- Died: 20 September 1923 (aged 59); Kingdom of Greece
- Military career
- Allegiance: Kingdom of Greece
- Branch: Hellenic Army
- Service years: 1882–1917, 1920–1923
- Rank: Major General
- Commands: 1st Infantry Division; I Army Corps; II Army Corps
- Conflicts: Greco-Turkish War (1897); Balkan Wars; Greco-Turkish War (1919-1922)
- Awards: Commander of the Order of George I Order of the Redeemer; Cross of Valour; Medal of Military Merit

Athanasios Fragkou or Fragkos (Greek: Αθανάσιος Φράγκου/Φράγκος, 1864–1923) was a Hellenic Army officer who reached the rank of Major General.

== Biography ==
He was born on 1 January 1864 in the village of Sourpi in the modern Magnesia Prefecture (then under Ottoman rule). He joined the Hellenic Army on 5 November 1883, and later enrolled in the NCO School, from where he graduated in 1893 as a Second Lieutenant of Infantry. He participated in the Greco-Turkish War of 1897 and the Balkan Wars. As a monarchist, he was dismissed from the Army in 1917–1920 during the National Schism. He was reinstated with the electoral defeat of Eleftherios Venizelos in November 1920 which brought the monarchist opposition to power, and assumed command of the 1st Infantry Division in Anatolia, where he led it in all the battles of the Greco-Turkish War of 1919–1922. He played a crucial role during the collapse of the Greek front in the Battle of Dumlupınar in August 1922, trying to rally the collapsing Greek forces: he assumed command of the remainders of I and II Corps, forming them together in the so-called "Southern Group" and led their retreat towards Çeşme, where they embarked on ships for the islands of Chios and Lesbos. Following the outbreak of the Venizelist-led 11 September 1922 Revolution among the surviving Army units, he was dismissed from service.

He died on 20 September 1923.

== Sources ==
- Μεγάλη Στρατιωτική και Ναυτική Εγκυκλοπαιδεία. Τόμος Στ′: Σαράντα Εκκλησίαι – Ώχρα [Great Military and Naval Encyclopedia. Volume VI] (in Greek). Athens. 1930. p. 517.
