= Lykourgos Sakellaris =

Greek politician (1947–2018)

Lykourgos Sakellaris of Dimitrios (Greek: Λυκούργος Σακελλάρης του Δημητρίου; 1947 – 2018), was a Greek politician, founding member of PASOK. He acted as Governor of the Thessaloniki Prefecture from 1982 to 1985.

== Biography ==
He was born in Sourpi in 1947. He studied civil engineering in the Aristotle University of Thessaloniki and was a founding member of PASOK in 1974 and took part in the first initiative group of the party, in September 1974. He acted as secretary of the Prefectural Council of the Movement for the prefectures of Ioannina from 1975 to 1976 and Magnesia from 1980 to 1982.

He was appointed Governor of the Thessaloniki Prefecture in March 1982 and worked there until 1985.

From 1985 to 1987 he was a general secretary of the Ministry of the Interior.

In 1997 he was president of the Hellenic Vehicle Industry (ΕΛΒΟ).

He died aged 71 of cancer on 16 June 2018 in Thessaloniki and was buried on the next day in Kalamaria. He was married and had 2 children, Dimitris, who is an ophthalmologist, and Niki, who is a teacher.
