= Third Balkan War =

Third Balkan War may refer to:

- Balkan Front (World War I) of World War I in the 1910s
- Yugoslav Wars, or any of the individual wars, stemming from the breakup of Yugoslavia in the 1990s

== See also ==
- Balkan Wars, prior to World War I from 1912 to 1913
  - First Balkan War, 1912–1913 war between the Balkan League and the Ottoman Empire
  - Second Balkan War, 1913 war between Bulgaria and Balkan states
