= Balkan Front (World War I) =

Theatre of WWI

Balkans theatre
- Part of the European theatre of World War I
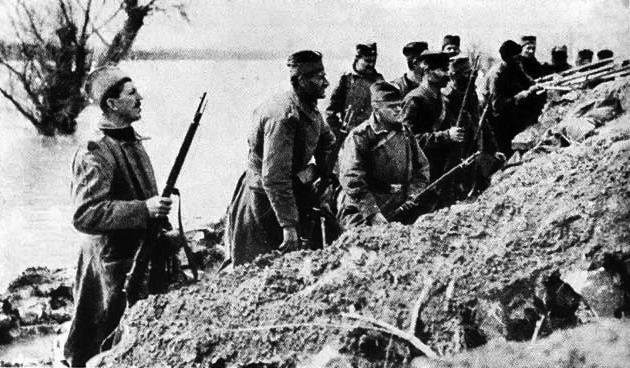
- Serbian troops during the opening of the war c. 1914
Date	July 28, 1914 – November 11, 1918
Location	Serbia, Montenegro, Albania, Greece, Bulgaria
Result	Allied Powers victory; Treaty of Neuilly-sur-Seine; Liberation of Serbia, Albania and Montenegro

Belligerents
Central Powers: Austria-Hungary; Bulgaria (from 1915); Germany (from 1915); Ottoman Empire (1916–1917)	Allied Powers: Serbia; Montenegro; France (from 1915); United Kingdom (from 1915); Italy (from 1915); Russian Empire (1916–1917); Russian Republic (1917–1918); (Russia) Russian Legion (1918); Greece (from 1917)

Commanders and leaders
(Tsardom of Bulgaria (1908–1946)) Ferdinand I; (Tsardom of Bulgaria (1908–1946)) Nikola Zhekov; (Tsardom of Bulgaria (1908–1946)) Kliment Boyadzhiev; (Tsardom of Bulgaria (1908–1946)) Dimitar Geshov; (Tsardom of Bulgaria (1908–1946)) Georgi Todorov; (Tsardom of Bulgaria (1908–1946)) Stefan Nerezov; (Austria-Hungary) Oskar Potiorek; (Austria-Hungary) E. von Böhm-Ermolli; (Austria-Hungary) Liborius von Frank; (Austria-Hungary) H. K. von Kövessháza; (German Empire) August von Mackensen; (German Empire) Otto von Below; (German Empire) Friedrich von Scholtz; (Ottoman Empire) Enver Pasha; (Ottoman Empire) Abdul Kerim Pasha	(Kingdom of Serbia) Peter I; (Kingdom of Serbia) Radomir Putnik; (Kingdom of Serbia) Petar Bojović; (Kingdom of Serbia) Živojin Mišić; (Kingdom of Serbia) Stepa Stepanović; (Kingdom of Serbia) Pavle Jurišić Šturm; (Kingdom of Montenegro) Nicholas I; (Kingdom of Montenegro) Janko Vukotić; (French Third Republic) Maurice Sarrail; (French Third Republic) Adolphe Guillaumat; (French Third Republic) Louis F. d'Espèrey; (Kingdom of Italy) Prince Emanuele Filiberto; (United Kingdom of Great Britain and Ireland) Bryan Mahon; (United Kingdom of Great Britain and Ireland) George Milne; (Kingdom of Greece) Panagiotis Danglis

Strength
(Tsardom of Bulgaria (1908–1946)) 1,200,000; (Austria-Hungary) Unknown; (German Empire) Unknown; (Ottoman Empire) Unknown	(Kingdom of Serbia) 707,343; (Kingdom of Montenegro) 50,000; (French Third Republic) 350,000+; (United Kingdom of Great Britain and Ireland) 404,207; (Kingdom of Italy) 144,000; (Kingdom of Greece) 230,000; (Russian Empire) 17,884; Total: 1,885,550+

Casualties and losses
(Tsardom of Bulgaria (1908–1946)) 267,000 87,500 killed 152,930 wounded 27,029 missing/captured; (Austria-Hungary) 300,000+; (German Empire) Unknown; (Ottoman Empire) "a few thousand"	Serbian campaign: (Kingdom of Serbia) 434,000; Macedonian front: (French Third Republic) 20,000–40,000 casualties; (Kingdom of Serbia) 40,000 casualties; (United Kingdom of Great Britain and Ireland) 26,207 casualties; (Kingdom of Italy) 10,538 casualties; (Kingdom of Greece) 27,000 casualties; Unknown

The Balkan Front, Balkans theatre or Balkan campaign was a theatre of World War I fought between the Central Powers (Austria-Hungary, Bulgaria, Germany and the Ottoman Empire) and the Allies (Serbia, Montenegro, France, the United Kingdom, Russia, Italy, and later, Greece).

The offensive began in 1914 with three failed Austro-Hungarian offensives into Serbia costing the Austro-Hungarians 100,000 troops on the first day. A new attempt a year later by the combined forces of Austria-Hungary, Germany, and Bulgaria led to the conquest and occupation of Serbia and Montenegro. The Serbian military did not surrender, retreating through the mountains of Albania and evacuated to Corfu before reforming in Salonika a few months later. On the Macedonian front, the Royal Serbian Army joined the Franco-British Allied Army of the Orient and fought a protracted trench war against Bulgarian and German forces. The Allied army presence in Greece resulted in the National Schism on whether Greece should join the Allies or remain neutral, which would benefit the Central Powers. Greece eventually joined the Allied Powers in 1917. In September 1918, the Vardar Offensive had broken through the Bulgarian lines, forcing them to surrender. Serbia, Albania and Montenegro's liberation soon followed.

== Overview ==
The prime cause of the war was hostility between Serbia and Austria-Hungary. Serbia held out against Austria-Hungary for over a year before being defeated in November 1915 during the Serbian campaign.

Dalmatia was a strategic region during the war that Italy and Serbia intended to seize from Austria-Hungary. Italy entered the war upon agreeing to the 1915 Treaty of London, which promised them a substantial portion of the territory. However, the nation was granted only a small part of Dalmatia in the 1919 Treaty of Versailles, leading to discontent among the Italian populace. This resentment, coupled with a desire to restore national pride, provided fertile ground for the emergence of fascist ideology under the leadership of Benito Mussolini. Mussolini's promise to rejuvenate Italy and return it to a position of power resonated with many Italians contributing to the rise of his "Fasces of Combat" in the country.

During World War I, the retreating Serbian troops fled to Albania, prompting the Central Powers to invade Albania. To aid the Serbian forces, Italian transport ships in the Adriatic Sea helped evacuate them to Corfu and other Greek islands before being relocated to Thessaloniki. Meanwhile, the Allies landed in neutral Greece and formed the Macedonian front. In 1917, Greece joined the war on the Allies side, and the multinational Allied Army of the Orient, stationed in northern Greece, launched an offensive in 1918. The offensive resulted in Bulgaria seeking a peace treaty, the recapture of Serbia, and a halt only at the border of Hungary in November 1918.

== Serbian–Montenegrin campaign ==
The Serbian forces defended against the larger Austro-Hungarian Army due to a Russian invasion from the north. In 1915, Austria-Hungary placed additional soldiers on the southern front and brought Bulgaria as an ally for the Central Powers.

Soon, the Serbian military was attacked from the north and the east, forcing a retreat to Greece. Despite the loss, the retreat was successful, and the Serbian military remained operational in Greece with a newly established base.

== Italian campaign ==
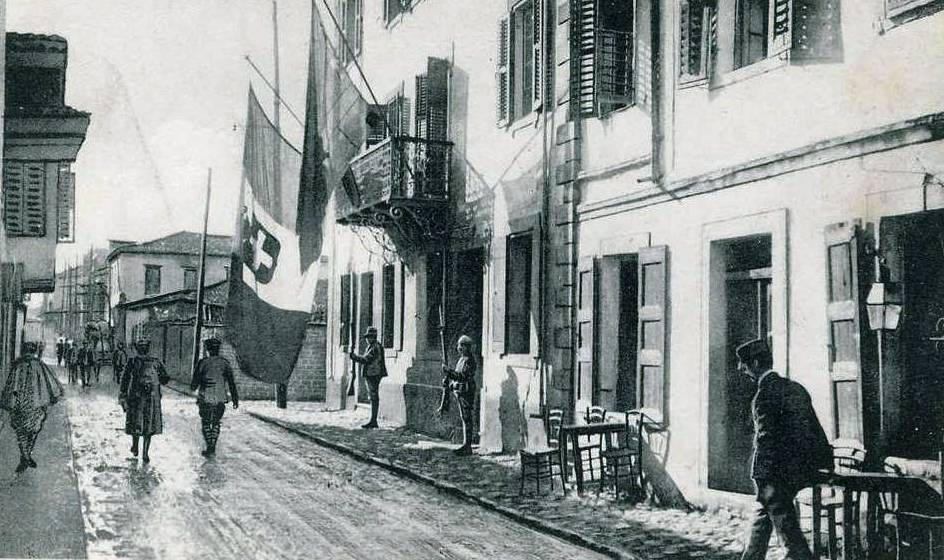
Italian soldiers in Vlorë, Albania during World War I. The tricolour flag of Italy, bearing the Savoy royal shield, is shown hanging alongside an Albanian flag from the balcony of the Italian prefecture headquarters.

Before direct intervention in the war, Italy had occupied the port of Vlorë in Albania in December 1914. Upon entering the war, Italy spread its occupation to the region of southern Albania beginning in the autumn of 1916. Italian forces in 1916 recruited Albanian irregulars to serve alongside them. Italy, with the permission of Allied command, occupied Northern Epirus on August 23, 1916, forcing the Greek military to withdraw its occupation forces in the area.

In June 1917, Italy proclaimed central and southern Albania to be a protectorate of Italy. Northern Albania was allocated to the states of Serbia and Montenegro. By October 31, 1918, French and Italian forces had expelled the Austro-Hungarian military from Albania.

Dalmatia was a strategic region during World War I that Italy and Serbia intended to seize from Austria-Hungary. Italy joined the Allies in 1915 upon agreeing to the London Pact, which guaranteed it the right to annex a large portion of Dalmatia in exchange for Italy's participation on the Allied side. From November 5 to 6, 1918, Italian forces were reported to have reached Lissa, Lagosta, Sebenico, and other localities on the Dalmatian coast.

By the end of hostilities in November 1918, the Italian military had seized control of the entire portion of Dalmatia that had been guaranteed to Italy by the London Pact and by the 17th had captured Fiume as well. In 1918, Admiral Enrico Millo declared himself Italy's Governor of Dalmatia. The famous nationalist Gabriele d'Annunzio supported the seizure of Dalmatia and proceeded to Zadar in an Italian warship in December 1918.

== Bulgaria ==
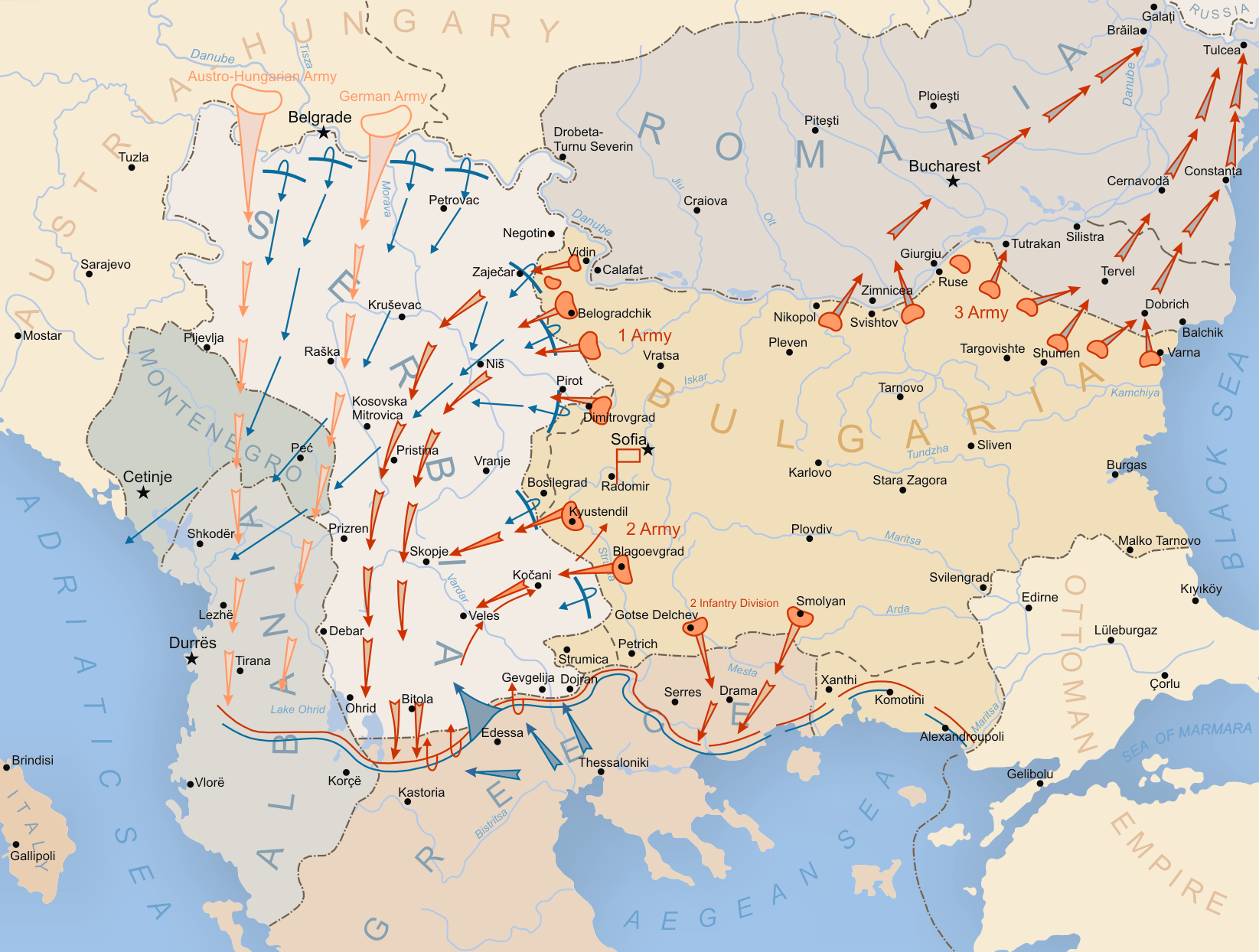
Bulgaria during World War I.

In the aftermath of the Balkan Wars, Bulgarian opinion turned against Russia and the Western powers, whom the Bulgarians felt had done nothing to help them. Russia blamed Bulgaria for breaking up the alliance it had forged and for starting the Second Balkan War against its former allies and now looked to Serbia as a more reliable Slavic ally against Austria-Hungary. The Bulgarian government aligned itself with Germany and Austria-Hungary, even though this meant also becoming an ally of the Ottomans, Bulgaria's traditional enemy. Bulgaria could no longer hold claims against the Ottomans, but Serbia, Greece, and Romania (allies of Britain and France) still held lands the Bulgarians perceived as Bulgarian.

Bulgaria, recuperating from the Balkan Wars, sat out the first year of World War I. When Germany promised Bulgaria all of Serbian Macedonia, parts of northeastern Serbia, as well as a new loan of 200,000,000 gold francs, Bulgaria declared war on Serbia in October 1915. Britain, France and Italy then declared war on Bulgaria.

Although Bulgaria, allied with Germany and Austria-Hungary, won military victories against Serbia and Romania: occupying much of Southern Serbia (taking Nish, Serbia's war capital on November 5), advancing into Greek Macedonia. They were assisted by the IMRO who joined the Bulgarian army as the 11th Macedonian Infantry Division. Bulgaria later took Dobruja from the Romanians in September 1916, the war soon became unpopular with the majority of Bulgarian people, who had suffered enormous economic hardship. The Russian Revolution of February 1917 had a significant effect in Bulgaria, spreading antiwar and anti-monarchist sentiment among the troops and in the cities.

In September 1918, a collective group of Serbian and Allied forces broke through on the Macedonian front in the Vardar Offensive. While Bulgarian forces stopped them in Dojran, Tsar Ferdinand was forced to sue for peace.

To head off the revolutionaries, Ferdinand abdicated in favour of his son Boris III. The revolutionaries were suppressed successfully, and their forces disbanded. Under the Treaty of Neuilly (November 1919), Bulgaria lost its Aegean coastline in favour of the Principal Allied and Associated Powers (transferred later by them to Greece) and nearly all of its Macedonian territory to the new state of Yugoslavia, and had to give Dobruja back to the Romanians (see also Dobruja, Western Outlands, Western Thrace).

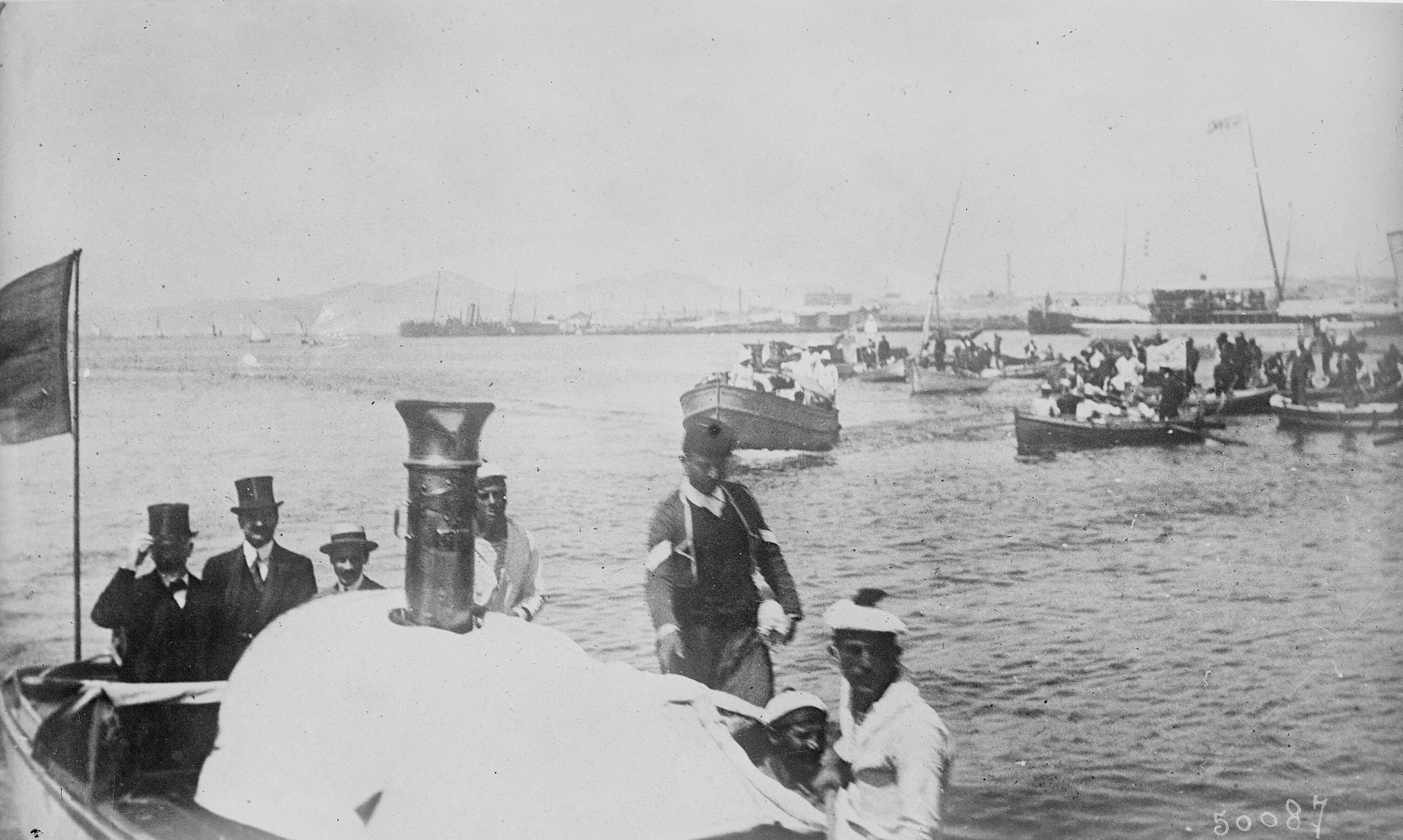
The arrival of Venizelos to Athens with French ships, June 1917, following French capture Thessaly

== National Schism ==
Following the start of World War I the Kingdom of Greece was politically split between joining the war and being neutral, led by the Pro-Entente Venizelos and the pro-Central Powers King Constantine. Following the conquest of Serbia Venizelos allowed the Allies into Thessaloniki leading to the creation of the Macedonian front. Following this Venizelos set up the Provisional Government of National Defence in Allied-controlled North Greece. The Allies and the Provisional Government of National Defence clashed during the Noemvriana.

The inability of the Kingdom of Greece to join World War I against the Central Powers lead the United Kingdom and France to recognize the Provisional Government of National Defence as the legitimate government of Greece, and blockaded Greece. In June, 1917 the French captured Thessaly and King Constantine fled Greece and Venizelos re-entered Athens, declaring war on the Central Powers in July.

== Macedonian Front ==
In 1915, the Austro-Hungarians gained the support of Germany and allied with Bulgaria. Serbian forces were attacked from both north and south, forcing them to retreat through Montenegro and Albania, with only 155,000 Serbs, mainly soldiers, reaching the coast of the Adriatic Sea and evacuating to Greece by Allied ships.

The Macedonian front stabilized roughly around the Greek border after the intervention of a Franco-British-Italian force that had landed in Salonica. The German generals had not let the Bulgarian army advance toward Salonica because they hoped to persuade the Greeks to join the Central Powers.

In 1918, after a prolonged build-up, the Allies, under French General Franchet d'Esperey, led a combined French, Serbian, Greek and British army attack out of Greece. His initial victories convinced the Bulgarian government to sue for peace. He then attacked the north and defeated the German and Austro-Hungarian forces that tried to halt his offensive.

By October 1918, having recaptured all of Serbia his forces prepared to invade Hungary proper until the Hungarian leadership offered to surrender in November 1918, halting the offensive.

== Results ==
The French and British each kept six divisions on the Greek frontier from 1916 to late 1918. The French and British went to Greece to help Serbia, but with Serbia's conquest in the fall of 1915, their continued presence there did not have an effect, so they relocated their forces to the Western Front.

In mid-1918, led by General Franchet d'Esperey, those forces were added to in order to conduct a major offensive on the south flank of the Central Powers (8 French divisions, 6 British divisions, 1 Italian division, 12 Serbian divisions). After the successful offensive launched on September 10, 1918, they freed Belgrade, forcing Bulgaria to an armistice on September 29, threatening Austria-Hungary (which accepted an armistice on November 4, 1918) and the German political leadership.

The historian John Keegan argued that "the installation of a violently nationalist and anti-Turkish government in Athens led to Greek mobilization in the cause of the "Great Idea" - the recovery of the Greek Empire in the east - which would complicate the Allied effort to resettle the peace of Europe for years after the war ended."

== Sources ==
- Chary, F.B. (2011). The History of Bulgaria. Greenwood histories of the modern nations. Greenwood. ISBN 978-0-313-38446-2.
- Dutton, D. J. (January 1979). "The Balkan Campaign and French War Aims in the Great War". The English Historical Review. 94 (370): 97–113. doi:10.1093/ehr/XCIV.CCCLXX.97. JSTOR 567160.
- Fried, M. (2014). Austro-Hungarian War Aims in the Balkans during World War I. Springer. ISBN 978-1-137-35901-8.
- Leon, George B. (1974). Greece and the Great Powers, 1914-1917. Institute for Balkan Studies.
- Luckau, A. (1971). The German Delegation at the Paris Peace Conference. H. Fertig. ISBN 978-0-86527-078-7.
- Lyon, James (2015) [1995]. Serbia and the Balkan Front, 1914: The Outbreak of the Great War. Bloomsbury Publishing. ISBN 978-1-4725-8005-4.
- Mitrović, Andrej (2007). Serbia's Great War, 1914–1918. London: Hurst. ISBN 978-1-55753-477-4.
- Nigel Thomas; Dusan Babac (2012). Armies in the Balkans 1914–18. Bloomsbury Publishing. ISBN 978-1-78096-735-6.
- Omiridis Skylitzes, Aristeidis (1961). Ο Ελληνικός Στρατός κατά τον Πρώτον Παγκόσμιον Πόλεμον, Τόμος Δεύτερος, Η Συμμετοχή της Ελλάδος εις τον Πόλεμον 1918 [Hellenic Army During the First World War 1914–1918: Hellenic Participation in the War 1918] (in Greek). Vol. II. Athens: Hellenic Army History Department.
- Sfika-Theodosiou, A. (1995). "The Italian presence on the Balkan Front (1915-1918)". Balkan Studies. 36 (1): 69–82.
