= Sourpi =

Sourpi Σούρπη
- Municipal unit
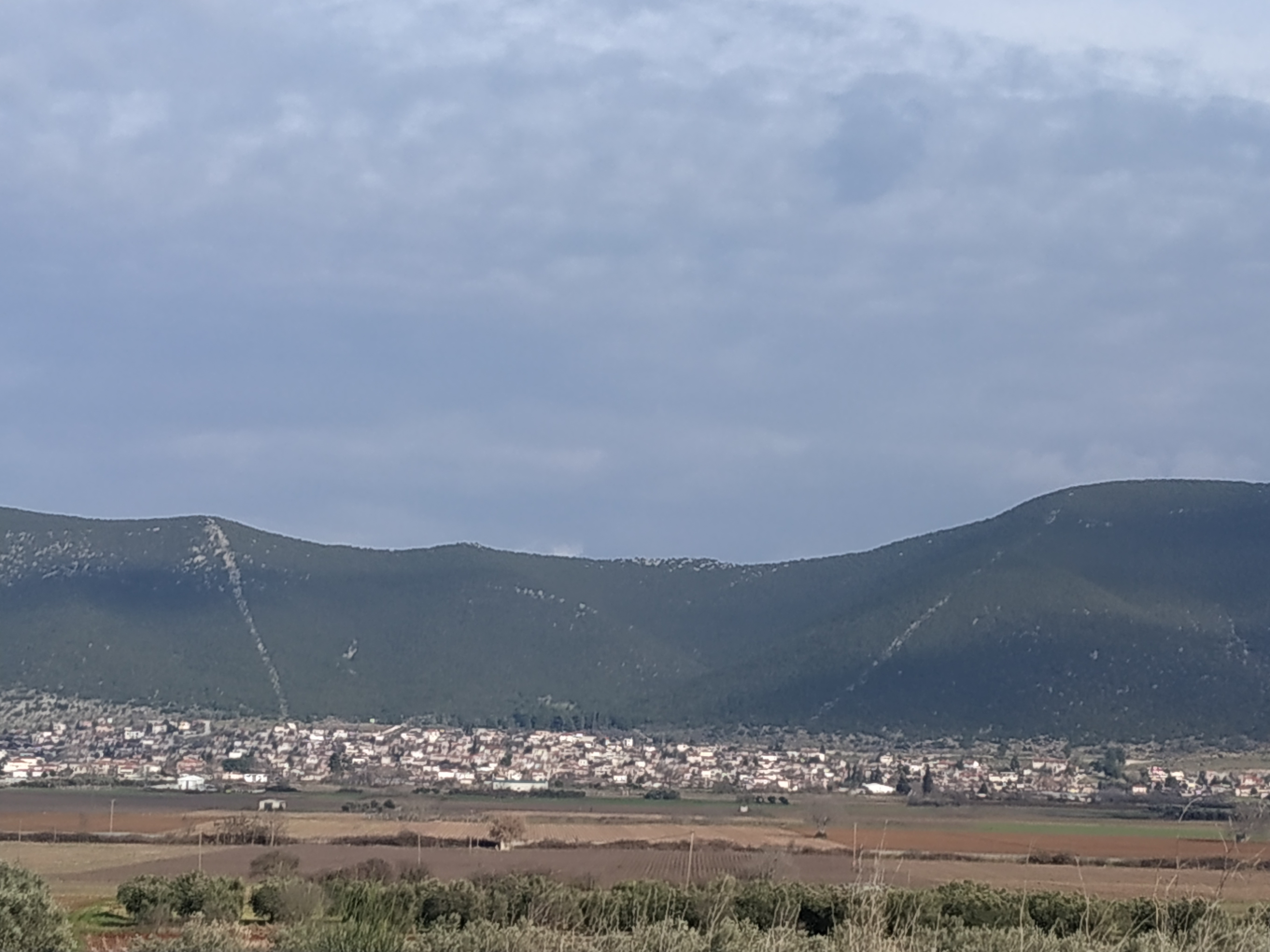
- Sourpi

- Location within Greece
- Coordinates: 39°06′N 22°54′E
- Country: Greece
- Administrative region: Thessaly
- Regional unit: Magnesia
- Municipality: Almyros

Area
  - Municipal unit: 191.3 km^{2} (73.9 sq mi)

Population (2021)
  - Municipal unit: 2,485
  - Municipal unit density: 12.99/km^{2} (33.64/sq mi)
  - Community: 1,384
- Time zone: UTC+2 (EET)
  - Summer (DST): UTC+3 (EEST)
- Vehicle registration: ΒΟ

Sourpi (Greek: Σούρπη) is a village and a former municipality in Magnesia, Thessaly, Greece. It is predominantly populated by Aromanians (Vlachs). Since the 2011 local government reform it is part of the municipality Almyros, of which it is a municipal unit. The municipal unit has an area of 191.335 km^{2}. Population 2,485 (2021).

== Notable people ==
- Ioannis Dimokostoulas, politician
- Konstantinos Dimokostoulas, politician
- Ioannis Drosopoulos (1864-1939), Governor of the Bank of Greece
- Athanasios Fragkou (1864-1923), Major General in the Greek Army
- Lykourgos Sakellaris (1947-2018), politician
