= Old Greece =

Geopolitical and cultural term for mainland Greece

The term Old Greece (Ancient Greek: Παλαιά Ἑλλάς, Greek: Παλαιά Ελλάδα) is a geographical, cultural, and political term used at different times for southern and predominantly mainland Greece.

== Classical studies ==
In Classical studies, "Old Greece" is the area of Greece defined as the core of the ancient Greek world by the 2nd-century geographer Pausanias in his Description of Greece. It comprises the Peloponnese and the eastern part of Central Greece, including Attica, but excluding the islands, thus largely corresponding with the area controlled by the major city-states in the mainland of Classical Greece, e.g., Athens, Sparta, Thebes. It roughly corresponds to the Roman province of Achaea.

== Modern Greece ==
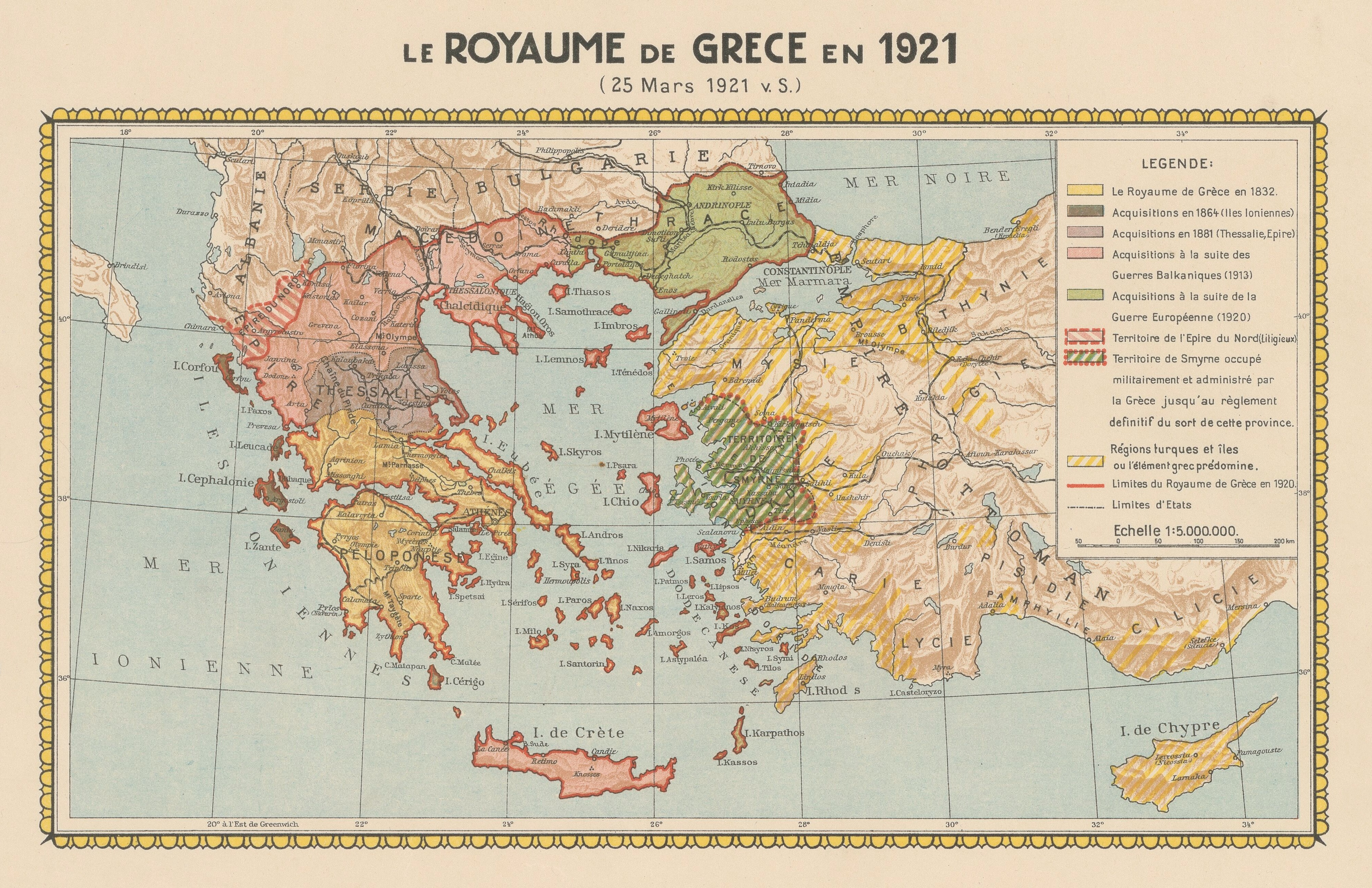
Old Greece corresponds to the area controlled by the Kingdom of Greece in 1832. Most later expansions (e.g., Crete and Macedonia) were led by Prime Minister Eleftherios Venizelos, whose leadership caused friction with the King Constantine I.

In modern Greek history, the term "Old Greece" refers to the Kingdom of Greece before the Balkan Wars of 1912–1913, including the Peloponnese, all of Central Greece, and the Cyclades, which formed the initial independent Greek state in 1832; the Ionian Islands, annexed in 1864; and Thessaly and the part of Epirus annexed in 1881. The territories acquired during and after the Balkan Wars—in Epirus, Macedonia and Thrace, as well as Crete and the eastern Aegean islands—are known as the "New Territories" or "New Lands" (Νέαι Χῶραι). This division became entrenched in cultural and political affiliations during the National Schism between King Constantine I and the liberal politician Eleftherios Venizelos: in "Old Greece" a traditional clientelist party system was entrenched and the population was largely pro-monarchist, whereas the "New Lands", annexed under Venizelos' tenure as prime minister and associated with his irredentist foreign policy, were pro-Venizelist.

== Additional reading ==
- Ober, Josiah (2015). The Rise and the Fall of Classical Greece. Princeton: Princeton University Press. ISBN 9780691173146.
