= French occupation of Thessaly =

- Part of National Schism of World War I
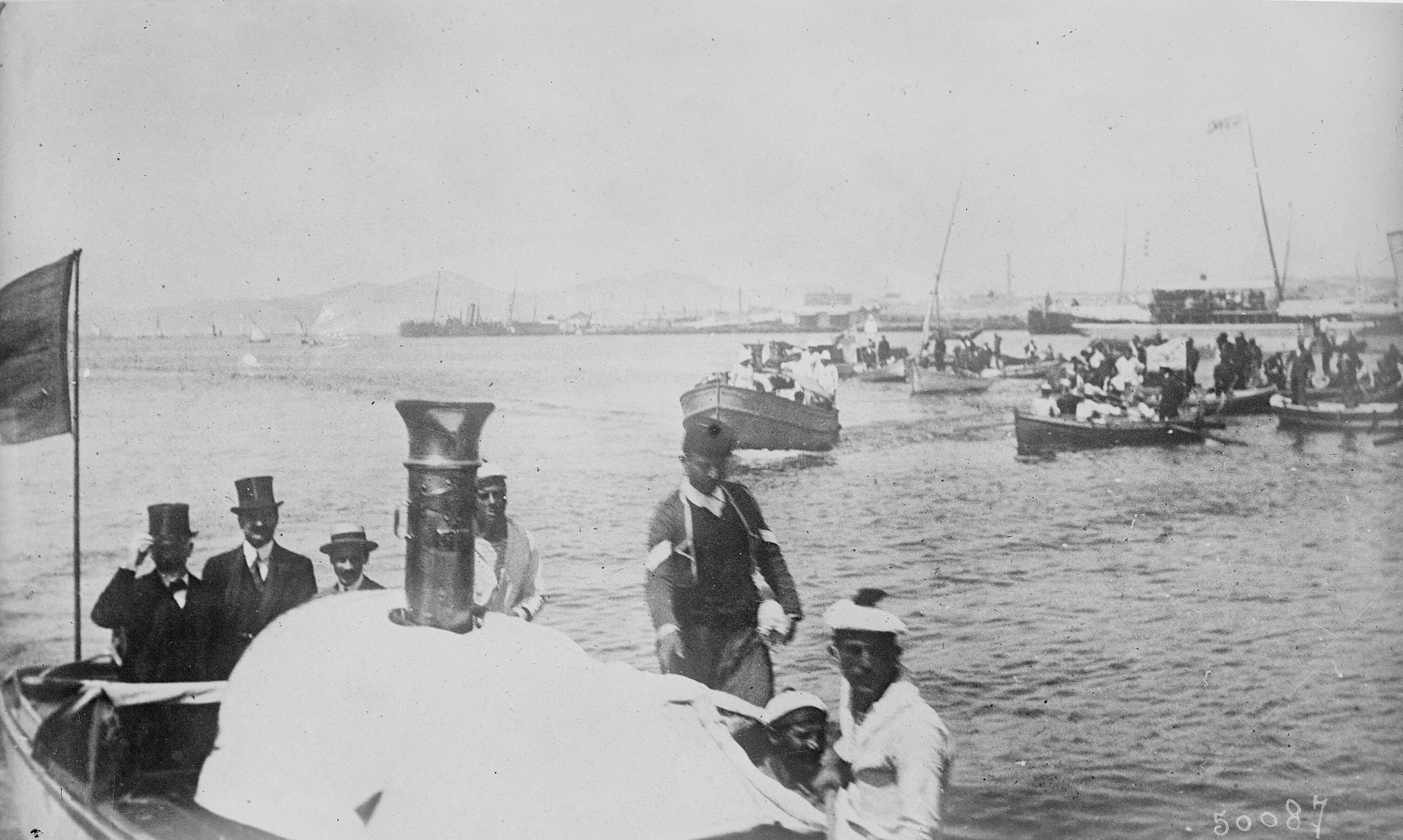
- Venizelos returning to Greece following the end of the Campaign, July 1917
Date	June 11, 1917 – June 26, 1917
Location	Thessaly, Greece

Belligerents
(Greece) Provisional Government of National Defence; France	Kingdom of Greece

Commanders and leaders
(French Third Republic) Maurice Sarrail	(Greece) Constantine I (Greece) Athanasios Frangou

Units involved
(French Third Republic) Two infantry regiments with three infantry battalions each; four cavalry regiments; two artillery divisions and two aircraft squadrons	(Greece) 1/38 National Guard Command

Strength
20,000	800

Casualties and losses
7 killed, 15 wounded	59 killed

The French occupation of Thessaly took place in June 1917, during the First World War, as part of the Allied intervention in the Greek National Schism. The chief military clash of the occupation became known as the Battle of the Flag (Greek: μάχη της σημαίας).

== Events ==
The French army occupied consecutively on June 11 – Elasson; June 12–14 – Larissa; on 13/15 June – Velestino, Volos and Trikala; on June 15/17 – Kalambaka, and on June 26 – Lamia.

The chief military confrontation of the operation occurred when the French attempted to disarm the 1/38 Evzone Regiment in Larissa, under the command of Lt. Colonel Athanasios Frangos. The regiment refused to obey the command to surrender its weapons and retreated west towards the mountains. The French launched Moroccan sipahis in pursuit of the unit, encircling it and forcing it to surrender after clashes (named "Battle of the Flag", as the Greeks carried the regimental standard with them) that claimed the lives of 59 Greek officers and soldiers, as well as seven killed and 15 wounded on the French side.

At the same time, the Allies issued an ultimatum to Constantine, threatening to bombard Athens. As a result King Constantine I of Greece abdicated.

At least 200 royalist Greek MPs, municipal leaders, lawyers, and doctors were interned into a prison camp in Thessaloniki. The Thessaloniki concentration camp was surrounded by double rows of wire mesh, and the guard was made up of Cambodian and Senegalese soldiers.

== See also ==
- Provisional Government of National Defence
- National Schism
