= Konstantinos Dimokostoulas =

Greek politician

Konstantinos Dimokostoulas (Greek: Κωνσταντίνος Δημοκωστούλας) was a Greek politician.

== Biography ==
He was born in Sourpi, Almyros and was a lawyer. He was elected MP for Fthiotida and Phocis in the November 1910 Greek legislative election and was reelected, as MP for Larisa, in 1912 and May 1915.
