= Ioannis Dimokostoulas =

Greek politician

Ioannis Dimokostoulas (Greek: Ιωάννης Δημοκωστούλας) was a Greek politician.

== Biography ==
He was born in Sourpi, Magnesia. He was elected MP for Larisa in the August 1910 Greek legislative election.
