= National Schism =

1914–17 Greek political crisis during WWI

- Part of World War I
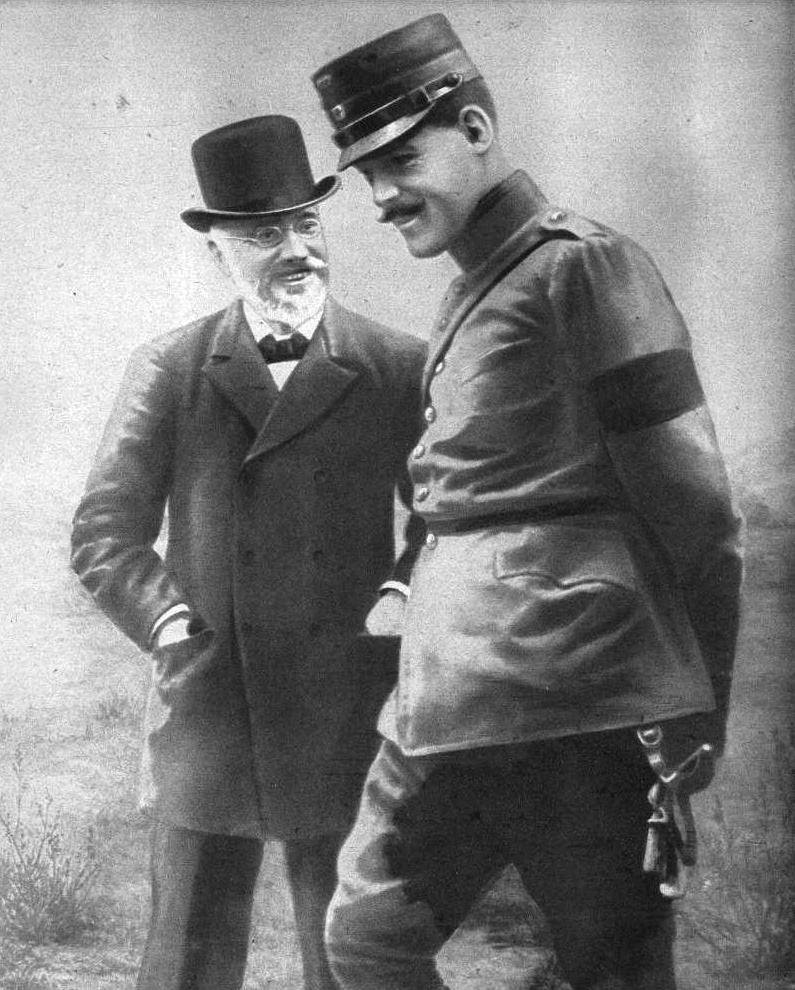
- Eleftherios Venizelos (left) and King Constantine I (right) prior to the National Schism c. 1913
| Date | 1914/15 – July 1917 |
| Location | Kingdom of Greece |
| Result | Venizelist victory: Exile of Constantine I; Accession of Alexander of Greece; Reunification of Greece; Official Greek entry in the war under Venizelos government (1917); Greece joins The Triple Entente (World War I) (1917) |

Belligerents
| (Greece) Royalists; Supported by: Germany; Austria-Hungary | (Greece) Venizelists; Supported by: France; United Kingdom; Italy |

Commanders and leaders
| Constantine I (Exiled)/ (surrendered); Ioannis Metaxas | Eleftherios Venizelos; Pavlos Kountouriotis; Panagiotis Danglis |

Casualties and losses
| 100+ | 200–300 |
- 8,000 Greek soldiers surrendered to Central Powers

The National Schism (Greek: Εθνικός Διχασμός, romanized: Ethnikós Dichasmós), also sometimes called The Great Division, was a series of disagreements between King Constantine I and Prime Minister Eleftherios Venizelos over Greece's foreign policy from 1915 to 1922. The central issue was whether Greece should join World War I, with Venizelos advocating for alignment with the Allies, while the king supported neutrality that favored the Central Powers. This personal conflict between the two men had far-reaching consequences, as it raised questions about the king's constitutional role in the state and eventually led to a deep division within Greek society.

After Bulgaria had entered the war against Serbia (already besieged by Germany's and Austria-Hungary's combined attack), in September 1915, Venizelos achieved a vote on October 4 in the parliament for a call to conscription, honoring the alliance treaty between Greece and Serbia. The next day Allied forces landed in Salonika to establish the Macedonian front. The King refused to sign the conscription bill, accusing Venizelos of treason for the 'invasion' in Salonika and forcing him to resign for a second time within that year (1915).

Eight months later, in May and June 1916, the palace counterweighted the grip of the Entente in Salonika with the unconditional surrender of a strong military fort along with half of the eastern part of Macedonia to the German-Bulgarian forces. The disagreements of the two men had now escalated towards a covert civil war. In August 1916, followers of Venizelos set up the Provisional Government of "National Defence", which controlled northern Greece, the Aegean Islands and Crete, and sided with Entente. This act, which effectively split Greece into north and south entities, had the aim of reclaiming the trust of the Entente along with the lost regions of Macedonia, and to regain control over northern Greece, gradually lost after the growing Army of the Orient had landed, one year earlier. After intense diplomatic negotiations, an armed confrontation in Athens between Allied and royalist forces with dozens of casualties, some due to lynching by a royalist paramilitary organization, and a subsequent five-month naval blockade of the (southern part of the) Greek kingdom, King Constantine abdicated on 11 June 1917 (his eldest son George was bypassed, for also being anti-Entente), and was succeeded by his second son Alexander as king. Venizelos returned to Athens on 29 May 1917, and Greece, re-unified but under French armistice, officially joined the war on the side of the Allies.

Although Greece emerged victorious and secured new territory by the Treaty of Sèvres, the bitter effects of this division were the main features of Greek political life until the 1940s, and contributed to Greece's defeat in the Greco-Turkish War, the collapse of the Second Hellenic Republic, the 1925 Coup d'état by Pangalos and the dictatorial Metaxas regime. The National Schism reflected the differences between the "New Greece" formed by territorial gains after the Balkan Wars of 1912–13, consisting of Thrace, Macedonia, Epirus, Crete, and the North Aegean islands, and the "Old Greece" which consisted of the pre-1912 territories. People in "New Greece" were generally pro-Venizelist, while people in "Old Greece" were more pro-royalist.

== Source of the conflict ==
The main cause of the conflict was the dispute between Venizelos and King Constantine over power in Greece, in which the development of true representation had been slow since the creation of the state. Up until the 1870s and the King's acceptance of the principle that the leader of the majority party in Parliament should be given the mandate to form a government, the formation of political groupings around a leader who could govern if this pleased the King meant that the supposedly parliamentary government was actually at the monarch's discretion.

Many reformists and liberals viewed meddling by the monarchy in politics as deleterious. The negative public attitude towards the monarchy was strengthened by the defeat of the Greek army, headed by Constantine (then the Crown Prince), in the Greco-Turkish War of 1897. Many of these hopes for reform were also shared by young officers in the Hellenic Army, who felt humiliated by the defeat, and who were influenced by republicanism.

A "Military League" was formed, and on 15 August 1909, they issued a pronunciamiento at the Goudi barracks in Athens. The movement, which demanded reforms in government and military affairs, was widely supported by the public; King George was forced to give in to the military's demands. He appointed Kyriakoulis Mavromichalis as Prime Minister and accepted the dismissal of the Princes from the military.

However, it soon became apparent that the leadership of the League was not able to govern the country, and they looked for an experienced political leader, who would also preferably be anti-monarchist and not tainted by the "old-partyism" of the old system. The officers found such a man in the person of Eleftherios Venizelos, a prominent Cretan politician, whose clashes with Prince George, the island's regent, seemed to confirm his anti-monarchist and republican credentials.

With Venizelos' arrival, the League was sidelined, and the energetic and relatively young politician soon dominated Greek political life. His government carried out a large number of overdue reforms, including the creation of a revised constitution. However, he also established a close relationship with the King, resisted calls to transform the revisionary assembly into a constitutional one, and even reinstated the Princes in their positions in the army, with Crown Prince Constantine as its Inspector-General. The reestablishment of the Princes in the Army, such as of royalist officers like Metaxas (whom Venizelos appointed as his adjutant) and Dousmanis, caused protests by officers of the Military League (like Zorbas and Zymvrakakis), while the coming of the French military mission to Greece (1911–1914), was not welcomed by the Crown Prince and his German trained circle.

Venizelos's reforms had broken the influence of the House of Glücksburg over the civil service and created a patronage machine loyal to himself. In a society where traditional clan and family loyalties often determined political loyalties, the creation of a patronage machine loyal to the Liberal Party polarized Greek society between those who benefited from the patronage and who did not. Furthermore, those who felt excluded naturally looked towards the traditional dispenser of patronage, the royal family, to counterbalance the Liberals.

=== Balkan Wars (1912–14) ===
With the outbreak of the Balkan Wars, Constantine was immediately appointed again as commander-in-chief, and the successes of the army in the field, especially in the Second Balkan War against the Bulgarians, helped many forget his record in 1897. Constantine, now king, was being hailed as "laurel-crowned" and "Bulgar-slayer". It was, however, during this war that the first tension between Constantine and Venizelos surfaced, in a dispute over the army's course following the victory at Sarantaporo. Constantine wanted to march due north, towards Monastir, fearing otherwise that the Greek army could be encircled, while Venizelos was anxious that the army should turn east and capture the strategically important city and harbor of Thessaloniki.

The anxiety of Venizelos was doubled by the fact that the Bulgarians had also set their eyes on Thessaloniki, the most important in Macedonia, and were sending their own troops towards it. Eventually, Venizelos prevailed, and the Greeks captured the city only a few hours before the arrival of the Bulgarians. This episode was not publicised at the time, and in the aftermath of the Wars, the two men, king and prime minister, both wildly popular, were seen as making up a formidable partnership at the helm of the Greek state.

However, the antivenizelist opposition in the parliament gradually began rallying around the King. After the Second Balkan War and during the negotiations of the Treaty of Bucharest, Venizelos was heavily criticised for being too compliant against Bulgaria. Bulgaria finally took the lands of Western Thrace, even though it had been captured by the Greek army during the war. As for the port city of Kavala, the intervention of Kaiser Wilhelm II in favour of Greece was crucial for keeping it. Venizelos in the parliament supported that it wasn't against the Greek interests if Bulgaria secured Thrace, because Greece would gain a "stable spine".

Enver Pasha, the Ottoman minister of war and a member of the triumvirate that ruled the Ottoman Empire decided in January 1914 to "cleanse" the Ionia area of Anatolia of its Greek inhabitants, and in May 1914 unleashed the dreaded "Special Organization" of the Committee of Union and Progress (CUP) against the Ionian Greeks. The "cleansing" operation caused the deaths of at least 300,000 Ionian Greeks and, as intended, caused thousands more terrified refugees to flee across the Aegean Sea to Greece. In July 1914, the "cleansing operation" was stopped following strong protests from the Russian, French, and British ambassadors to the Sublime Porte, with the French ambassador Maurice Bompard speaking especially strongly in defense of the Ionian Greeks. The increasing intolerance of the CUP regime towards minorities in Anatolia with a new emphasis upon Turkish nationalism in place of Ottomanism, as reflected in the slogan "Turkey for the Turks!" brought the subject of the Anatolian Greeks to the fore in Greece, with two options being available, namely to bring Greece to the Anatolian Greeks by annexing parts of Anatolia or bring the Anatolian Greeks to Greece with a population exchange.

== Beginning of the conflict ==
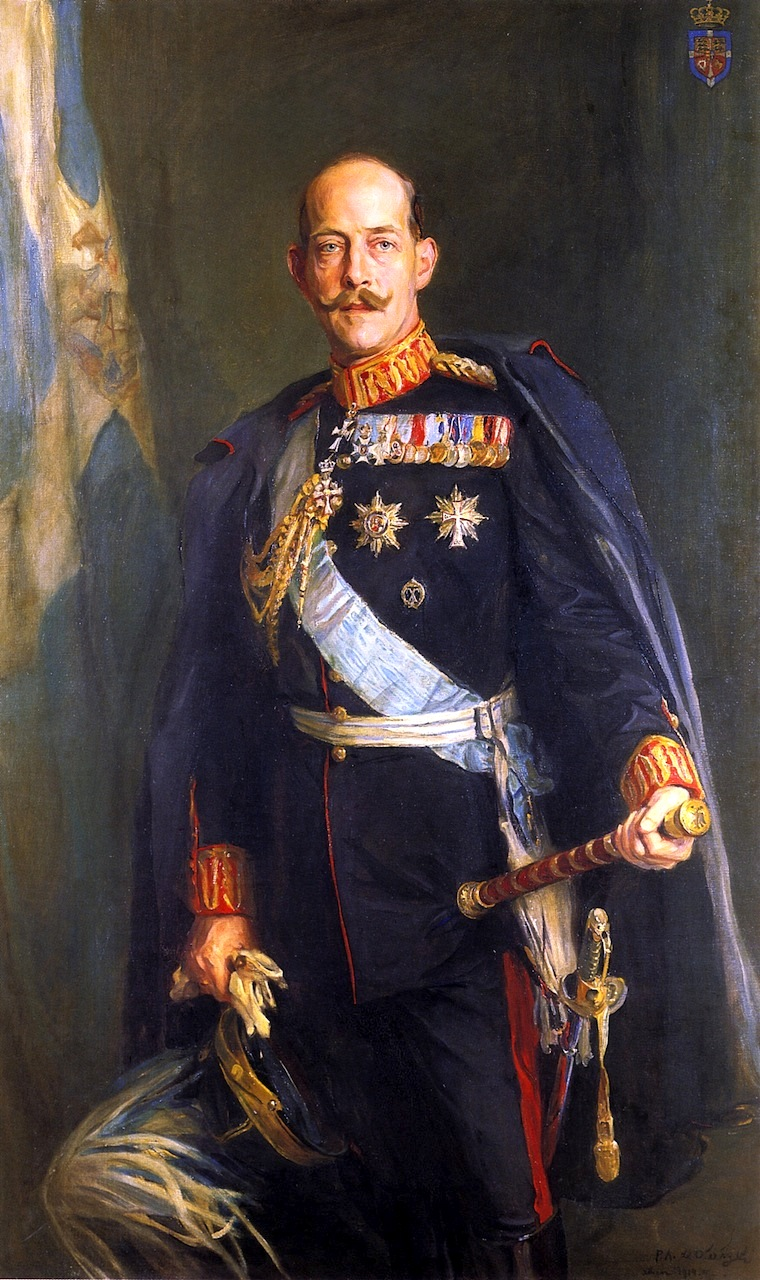
King Constantine I judged that Greece's interests were best served by remaining neutral in the First World War.

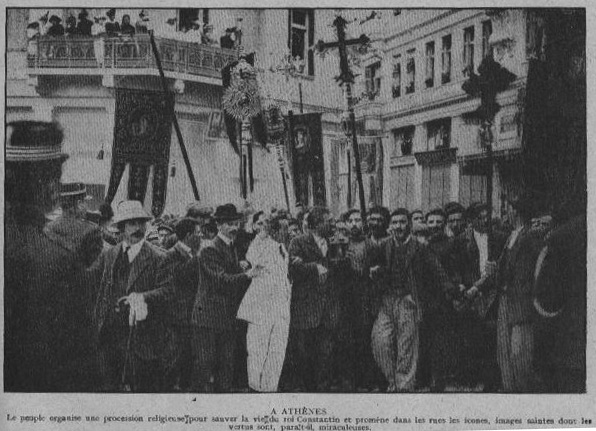
Demonstration in Athens in favour of Constantine, summer 1915

As the Great War began, the Greek authorities had to choose between neutrality and aligning themselves with the Allied forces. Outright participation in the war on the side of the Central Powers was not an option, both because of Greece's vulnerability to the Royal Navy and because, from early on (October 1914), Greece's traditional enemy, the Ottoman Empire, had joined in on Germany's side. Hence, neutrality was the course favored by most pro-German Greeks, including the senior, German-educated, leadership of the General Staff, who had great influence over the King.

For the first two months of the war, the Ottoman Empire maintained a pro-German neutrality, and the British, French and Russian governments waged a campaign of appeasement to try keep the Ottomans neutral. On 18 August 1914, Venizelos told the British minister in Athens Sir Francis Elliot that he wanted Greece to enter the war on the Allied side, but was curtly refused, saying the Allies preferred to keep the Ottoman Empire neutral. On 29 October 1914, the Ottomans attacked Russia in the Black Sea Raid and on 4 November 1914, Britain, France and Russia all declared war on the Ottomans. After the Ottoman decision to enter the war, the Allies were more open to making promises to Greece about fulfilling the Megali Idea. However, the Allies still wanted to keep Bulgaria neutral, and through King Ferdinand of Bulgaria was an Austrian, he was also known as "Foxy Ferdinand" due to his opportunistic and cunning qualities, leading to hopes that he might be bribed into remaining neutral. Venizelos was greatly disappointed that the Allies preferred to have Bulgaria neutral rather than having Greece fight on their side.

Greece had an ongoing mutual defense pact with Serbia, a member of the Allied forces, who were asking for support after they were invaded by Austria-Hungary, see Serbian Campaign (World War I).

However, Constantine believed it was in the greater interests of Greece to remain neutral. His considerable military experience and knowledge made him especially conscious of the threat to Greece from Bulgaria's powerful military in the event that the Hellenic Army was engaged in a war with Austria-Hungary. Beyond military considerations, there were personal reasons for the split between the king and the prime minister. Constantine had a basically autocratic personality and strongly disliked Venizelos as a person. Moreover, the king was a militaristic Germanophile who admired Prussian militarism and believed that the Reich would not be defeated in the present war. He was also married to Queen Sofia, the sister of the German Kaiser, Wilhelm II. The king had little respect for parliamentary government and preferred to deal with soldiers rather than politicians. Constantine, whose political style was fundamentally authoritarian, had been looking for an occasion to undo the "revolution" of 1909 for some time. His favorite adviser on both political and military affairs was the Germanophile General Ioannis Metaxas.

Knowing of the strong anti-Slavic racism held by Emperor Wilhelm II, Metaxas argued that Germany was the natural defender of "Hellenism against Slavism" and that Germany would not permit Bulgaria to gain territory from a German-friendly Greece. Metaxas argued against a war against the Ottoman Empire on the grounds that Greece did not have the logistical capability to support an army in Anatolia nor the economic resources to win such a war. Only the fear of a British naval blockade led Metaxas to advocate neutrality; otherwise, he was for Greece entering the war on the side of the Central Powers. Additionally, the King was bribed by the Auswaertiges Amt into remaining neutral, secretly taking in 1915 a "loan" of 40 million gold Reichsmark that went into his Swiss bank account. The Greek-Canadian journalist Philippe Gigantès argued that it was royal corruption with the "vast sums [of money] from Germany" that the king took was the most powerful reason for Constantine favoring neutrality, instead of the more altruistic reasons given by his admirers. According to Skouloudis and monarchist writers, the loan of 40 million Reichsmark from Germany was to the Greek government without any term of neutrality, with better interest than the Allied offers.

The Prime Minister, Venizelos, was strongly in favor of joining the Entente, as he believed that Greece would gain new lands and fulfill the Megali Idea. On 17 November 1914, Venizelos, in a speech before Parliament, stated that Greece would remain neutral in the war but would also stand by its alliance with Serbia. He also warned that Bulgaria under the leadership of the Austrian-born King Ferdinand would inevitably at some point along the line attack Serbia together with the Austrian Empire to annex Serbian Macedonia. Venizelos predicted that Ferdinand, who just attacked Serbia and Greece in May 1913 in order to take all of Macedonia for Bulgaria, would, after taking Serbian Macedonia, then turn south to invade Greece with the aim of annexing Greek Macedonia. Venizelos also warned that the Ottoman Empire, which had joined the war on Germany's side earlier that month, "would destroy Hellenism in Asia Minor" if Germany won. Venizelos was alluding to the savage campaign of persecution launched by the Turkish nationalist Committee of Union and Progress against the Ottoman Greek minority in May 1914. He further warned that even if the Ottomans were defeated, then "Hellenism in Asia Minor would still fall under alien domination". Metaxas's opposition to a campaign in Anatolia poisoned his relationship with Venizelos, starting one of the most famous feuds in Greek history as the two men came to completely detest one another, to the point that if one was for something, the other was almost automatically against it.

An important factor turned out to be the friendship between David Lloyd George and Venizelos. Lloyd George, the Chancellor of the Exchequer (the British equivalent to a finance minister), was the leader of the "Radical" (left-wing) of the British Liberal Party and was world famous as the most charismatic man in British politics. Owing to the precarious nature of the British Liberal government under Prime Minister H. H. Asquith, badly divided between the Radicals on the left vs. the Liberal Imperialists on the right, Lloyd George had far more power than a normal Chancellor of the Exchequer. Lloyd George had first met Venizelos in December 1912, and the budding friendship between the two men was encouraged by Domini Crosfield, the Greek wife of the Liberal MP Arthur Crosfield and the extremely wealthy arms dealer Basil Zaharoff. A Greek native of Anatolia who hated the Ottoman Empire, Zaharoff was the principal financier behind Venizelos's Liberal Party. Lloyd George was a Welshman while Venizelos was a Cretan, making both men into outsiders in their respective nations, providing a bond between the two men. By 1914, Lloyd George emerged as the most powerful voice for Greece within the British cabinet. Lloyd George's advocacy of Britain ceding Cyprus to Greece in exchange for leasing the naval base at Arostoli endeared him to Venizelos. Furthermore, Lloyd George's support for the Megali Idea persuaded Venizelos that if Greece entered the war, then it would have the support of the mighty British Empire. Venizelos was alarmed when he learned that the British and French had agreed that after the war, Russia would have Constantinople (modern Istanbul) together with the land around the Turkish Straits. Traditionally, the advocates of Megali Idea had seen Constantinople as the future capital of a new Roman empire. Italy was allied to Germany and Austria, but neutral; in an attempt to persuade the Italians to enter the war on their side, the Allies promised the Italians parts of Anatolia where the population was Greek, which was another reason for Venizelos to advocate entering the war to secure Greek-speaking territories of Asia Minor before the Allies took them all for themselves.

In January 1915, in an attempt to convince the Greeks to side with them, Britain offered Greece post-war concessions in Asia Minor (currently part of Turkey). Venizelos felt this was very much in Greece's interests and attempted to force a bill through the Greek parliament to join the Allies. Venizelos had agreed that the Greek lands of eastern Macedonia to be given to Bulgaria (so to join also the Allies) hoping for the post-war concessions in Asia Minor. In a memo to the king on 17 January 1915, Venizelos recommended ceding Kavala to Bulgaria as the British Foreign Secretary Sir Edward Grey had recommended, stating that this was a most painful sacrifice, but was necessary to protect the Greeks of Anatolia because if Greece did not enter the war "Hellenism in Asia Minor would be lost forever". Venizelos also planned a compulsory population exchange with Bulgaria with the Greeks living in Kavala to be expelled and resettled in Smyrna (modern Izmir, Turkey). Venizelos' proposals were made known by the Press and caused a shock to the public, such as among ex-soldiers that had recently fought in the Balkan wars. Demonstrations took place in Kavala (with the presence also of the Muslim and Jewish communities), and elsewhere, against these proposals.

Venizelos advised King Constantine to convene the Crown Council, which he did. It met twice, on February 18 and on February 20. In these meetings, Venizelos presented his case for joining the Entente, a course of action which was opposed by opposition leader Theotokis, but Rallis supported. However, staunch opposition by the King, Army generals (including the General Staff and Ioannis Metaxas) forced Venizelos to draw back. Metaxas said during the council: "Nobody has the right to give Greek land."

=== The Gallipoli campaign ===
On 19 February, British and French warships entered the Dardanelles with the aim of taking Constantinople (Gallipoli campaign). Venizelos argued that the end of the Ottoman Empire was imminent, and after receiving a message from Lloyd George that Britain would not allow Russia to dispose of Anatolia as she wished (the British had promised Constantinople with the straits to the Russians who rejected the Greek participation in the operation), argued that now was the time to enter the war. With the exceptions of Theotokis and Metaxas, all of the members of the Crown Council supported Venizelos at the second meeting of 20 February 1915, but the king remained opposed. Metaxas, the actual leader then of the General Staff, and advisor of Venizelos, didn't agree with the Greek Prime Minister in the participation in the operation, believing it would fail because the Germans had already fortified the straits and Greece would be vulnerable to a Bulgarian attack, and decided to resign. Venizelos resigned also shortly afterwards (on March, 6), when the King decided Greece to not participate in the operation, and was replaced with Dimitrios Gounaris. The new PM made statements to the Press about the proposals of Venizelos regarding Kavala increasing the social confusion and displeasure.

The conflict between the Venizelos and the king in large part represented a conflict between a vision of Greece was expanding under a reformist government allied to Britain vs. another vision of Greece was "narrow, suspicious and defensive". For the King, everything that had happened since the 1909 Goudi coup had been a diminution of his power, and he was determined to use the intervention debate as a way of restoring the pre-1909 status quo. The Greek historian John Mavrogorado wrote that Venizelos had "to face a strong opposition, composed of jealous party leaders, great provincial families, party bosses, majors and lawyers, the whole network of party jobbery whose power had been endangered by the reforms of 1910–11; and this opposition of personal hostility to Venizelos was cleverly utilized by the German propaganda, which had only to identify the policy of loyalty to Serbia and to the Protecting Powers with the figure of Venizelos in order to make this mixed opposition into a compact body of opinion working in effect if not intention for Germany". Lloyd George sent a Venizelos a message via Zaharoff proposing that British and French troops land in Thessaloniki to march north to aid Serbia, which would hopefully also deter Bulgaria from joining the Central Powers. The failure of the Anglo-French attempt to take Constantinople, which ended with the stalemate of the Battle of Gallipoli, was used by the king as a justification for his belief that Germany would win the war.

At a dinner with the wealthy Delta family in April 1915, Venizelos stated that Lloyd George had promised him that Greece could have all the Greek-speaking parts of Anatolia if she entered the war, leading him to say that Greece would enter the war on the Allied side regardless of Constantine's wishes. And if the king continued to block him, then Venizelos stated that he would push him aside just as he pushed his brother Prince George out as he was governor of Crete.

== The clash and schism of Greece ==
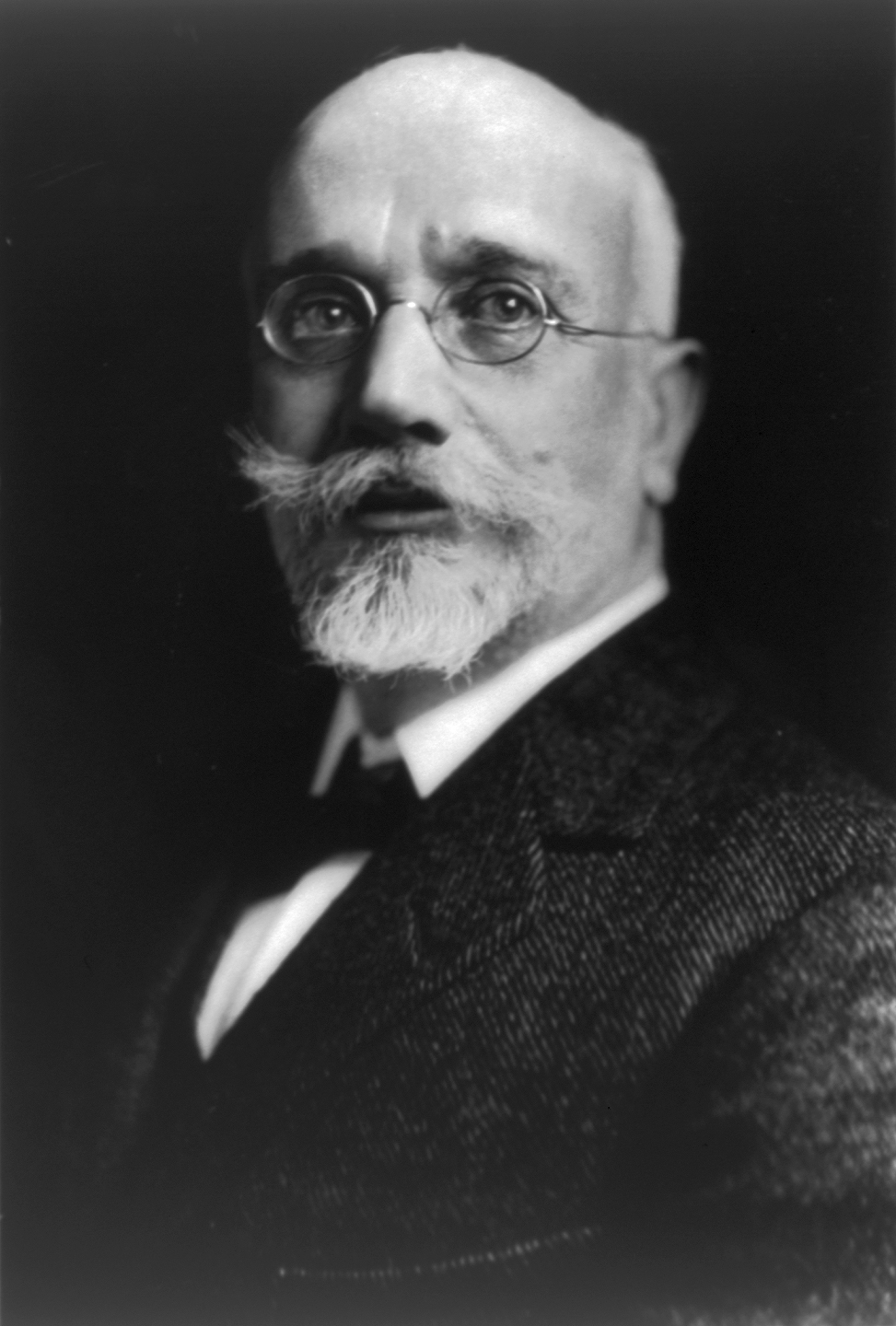
Eleftherios Venizelos, the Greek Prime Minister, believed that Greece's interests were best served by entering the war on the side of the Allies.

Venizelos's resignation caused political dissension in Greece. A political battle between the conservatives and Venizelos' supporters forced a general election in June 1915. These elections were won by Venizelos' Liberal Party and he resumed his post as prime minister, however Constantine delayed to ratify the appointment of the new government until August for health reasons (he barely escaped death). He had been ill with pleurisy since the Balkan wars and his health would never be the same.

In the 1915 election, the royalist parties did best in the pre-1912 "Old Greece" while the liberals did best in "New Greece". The newly returned prime minister forced the king to promise him that Greece would honor its alliance with Serbia if Bulgaria attacked, a promise the king had no intention of keeping. Venizelos stated that his win proved that the Greek people agreed with his pro-Entente policy.

By the fall of 1915, a propaganda war was being conducted in the Greek newspapers between Zaharoff, who used his vast wealth to start buying up newspapers to campaign for Venizelos vs. Baron von Schneck, the press attache at the German legation who purchased newspapers to campaign for the king. At the time, Schneck was described by one British journalist as "a great and mysterious power for evil who was leading the Greek nation astray and seducing it from the right path-from Venizelos and from the Entente". The head of Allied propaganda in Greece, a French naval officer, Captain de Roquefeil, was inept, leading Zaharoff to intervene as he argued that as a Greek he knew Greek mentalities far better than any Frenchman could. Antiwar and pro-German propaganda were made by newspapers Embros of Kalapothakis, Script and later Kathimerini and pro-Allied by Ethnos, Eleftheros Typos, Estia and Makedonia among others. Many documents and papers were also falsified during this period, and the propaganda war reached its peak.

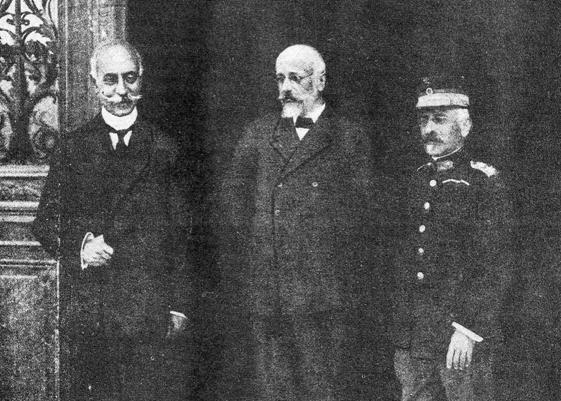
The "Triumvirate of National Defence" in Thessaloniki. L-R: Admiral Pavlos Kountouriotis, Venizelos, and General Panagiotis Danglis.

By this point, Constantine had secretly promised both the German and Bulgarian ministers that Greece would not go to war against them. Germany had also promised to Constantine secretly that if Greece remained neutral, she would have Northern Epirus and Dodecanese after the war, such as the protection of the Greek population in Turkey.

In fall of 1915, Ferdinand after receiving promises from German and Austrian diplomats that he could have the parts of Serbia he coveted, decided to enter the war. Bulgaria declared war on Serbia, which posed an immediate threat to the newly gained province of Macedonia, including the strategically important port of Thessaloniki. On 22 September, Bulgaria mobilized and began to mass troops on the border with Serbia. Since under the Serbian-Greek alliance committed each other to the defense of the other if attacked, Greece appeared to be on the brink of war.

Venizelos asked Constantine for mobilization of the Army. Constantine agreed to a defensive posture against Bulgaria but insisted on the condition that Greece would not attack first. Constantine now announced that he wished to disregard the alliance with Serbia, stating that it not apply if other powers (non-Balkan) also attacked Serbia. Plus, according to the treaty of alliance, Serbia had to provide 150,000 soldiers against Bulgaria. Since a large German-Austrian army under Field Marshal August von Mackensen was poised to invade Serbia at the same time as Bulgaria, the king announced that Greece would not be aiding Serbia. Venizelos told Constantine that: "We should not allow Bulgaria to crush Serbia and expand overmuch so as to crush us tomorrow. At this point therefore you cannot depart from this policy: unless of course you are determined to set aside the Constitution, and assuming full responsibility by a Royal degree". Constantine replied: "You know, I recognize that I am bound to obey the popular verdict when it is a question of the internal affairs of the country; but when it is a question of foreign affairs, great international questions, I think that so long as I believe a thing is right or not right, I must insist upon its being done or not done, because I am responsible before God". In a desperate attempt to persuade Constantine to help Serbia, Grey sent him a letter reading: "If Greece prepared to give support as an ally to Serbia, now that she has been attacked by Bulgaria, His Majesty's Government will be prepared to give Cyprus to Greece. Should Greece join the Allies for all purposes, she would naturally have a share with them in advantages secured at end of war, but the offer of Cyprus is made by H.M. Government independently on condition that Greece gives immediate and full support with her army to Serbia". Both the King and his prime minister Alexandros Zaimis turned the offer down.

=== Establishment of the Macedonian front ===
After his inability to sway Constantine to act against Bulgaria, Venizelos took a new route by allowing British and French troops to land in Thessaloniki, Macedonia in aid of Serbia, following their failed operation at Gallipoli, and after asking them if they could offer the 150,000 soldiers at the front.

Venizelos took advantage of this by forcing through a parliamentary motion (with a 37-vote margin) to declare war on Bulgaria. The invitation to the Allies by Venizelos enraged the King. The dispute between the Greek Prime Minister and the King reached its height shortly after, and the King invoked the Greek constitutional right that gave the monarch the right to dismiss a government. In December 1915, Constantine forced Venizelos to resign for a second time, after an anti-German speech of the latter in the parliament, and dissolved the Liberal-dominated parliament, calling a new election. In his speech, Venizelos warned that a German victory would be a disaster for Greece. Venizelos warned that in the event of a German victory, the Ottomans would wage genocide against the Greeks of Anatolia while allowing the Bulgarians to annex Serbian Macedonia, which would inevitably be followed up by demands for Greek Macedonia. After his speech, Venizelos was summoned to the royal palace, where the king told him that he was in disagreement with every point of his speech and predicted that Germany would win the war. The king also made the claim that he was accountable only to God, not the people, leading Venizelos to say that Greece was not an absolute monarchy. Venizelos left Athens and moved back to his native Crete.

The Liberals boycotted the new elections, which undermined the new Royalist government's position, as it was seen as a government directly appointed by the King, disregarding popular opinion. Venizelos complained that the Crown had intervened directly to interfere with the election campaign, and as a result of Venizelos's call for a boycott, only a quarter of Greek men voted in the election. The decision not to aid Serbia despite the alliance disillusioned certain Army officers led by General Panagiotis Danglis who felt that it is dishonorable to break treaties, and it was dangerous to allow Serbia to be occupied as now the Bulgarians could throw all their forces against Greece. A Liberal politician, George Kafandaris, charged in a speech that the royalists were promoting an anachronistic "divine right of kings" theory that had no place in a democracy. Kafandaris stated: "Such theories lead us to think that ideas once believed to have disappeared in the deep darkness of past human history are resurfacing again to influence contemporary life...Our system of government was modeled after that of Great Britain and is known as a constitutional monarchy. In a constitutional monarchy, the King is a passive instrument of the state in managing public affairs. All political authority is vested in the people and the members of parliament and government elected by the people".

The tension between the two parties grew gradually over the course of the following year (1916), with both sides taking a more radical and divisive approach to the situation. When French and British forces landed in Thessaloniki (as invited by Venizelos earlier), against Constantine's wishes, the Greek people supported the King's view that the Allies had violated the country's sovereignty. By the end of January 1916, there were 125,000 French and 100,000 British troops in Thessaloniki, having established the Macedonian front. Constantine made diplomatic attempts to drive them out, but in December 1915, in a meeting in Paris, the Allies had decided to keep the front at all costs.

=== Fort Roupel surrender and Allied reaction ===
However, later on, when the Central Powers took control of eastern Macedonia in May 1916, the public took similar outrage at the King's inability to defend Greek territory. Count Wilhelm von Mirbach, the German minister in Athens requested of the king the surrender of Fort Roupel, and the king duly ordered the garrison of the fort to surrender to a German-Bulgarian force. Without opposition, on 25 May 1916, 8,000 Greek soldiers at Fort Roupel surrendered and transferred to Germany, while the Bulgarians occupied the eastern half of Greek Macedonia including the port of Kavala. In 1915, pro-royalist supporters such as Metaxas had assailed Venizelos for his willingness to cede Kavala and the eastern half of Greek Macedonia to Bulgaria, and now the situation was reversed with the Venizelists attacking the king for surrendering the same lands to the Bulgarians. The surrender of Fort Roupel marked the point of no return in relations between Venizelos and Constantine, as the former was now convinced that the king was a traitor. The decision to surrender Fort Roupel was announced by the government as a counterbalance to the Allied presence in Thessaloniki, but there were other factors at play as well. By 1916, Constantine was willing to consider giving up parts of Macedonia to Bulgaria as the best way of weakening Venizelism. From the king's perspective, the loss of Macedonia, which was a stronghold of Venizelism, would be more than counter-balanced by the weakening of the Venizelist movement. According to the royal chronicler Zavitzianos, Constantine, since 1915 (and especially after the failed operation in Gallipoli), had concluded that the victory of the Central powers was militarily certain, and he in no way wanted to bring Greece against Germany. He was only asked by the German military authorities to not allow Bulgarian troops to enter Greek territory, but he was ignored.

After these events, General Sarrail imposed martial law in Thessaloniki, and on 21 June 1916, an Anglo-French ultimatum (considering themselves "protector powers" of the Greek state since its establishment in 1832) was submitted to Constantine, demanding the dismissal of Zaimis, new elections, and the demobilisation of the military. They also instituted a partial naval blockade to the Greek Kingdom. Italian forces also took the approval of the Triple Entente, entered Argyrokastro and took over most of Northern Epirus (which was under Greek administration since 1914), while the French captured Korçë.

On 19 August 1916, Constantine informed his royal chronicler Constantine Zavitzianos that he intended to keep control of military matters and foreign policy, which were royal prerogatives as far as he was concerned, and that it did not matter how many people supported Venizelos. In a speech in Athens on 27 August 1916, Venizelos for the first time publicly attacked the king, saying:

King of the Hellenes!
You have been a victim of men who, in order to undo the work of the Revolution (of which tomorrow is the seventh anniversary) and to restore the old regime of corruption, have not hesitated to traffic the people's reverence for the Crown and their devotion to your person...
You have been the victim of your military advisers, with the narrowness of the military understanding, and with the desire to establish an absolutism which should make them substantially masters of the situation, have persuaded you that Germany would emerge victorious from the European War.
You have been the victim finally of your own quite human and not unnatural weakness. Accustomed to admire everything German, bewildered by the unrivalled German organization of military and other affairs of every sort, you not only expected a German victory, but you came to desire it, hoping that it would enable you to concentrate in your own hands all the authority of the government, and substantially to set aside our free Constitution."

By August 1916, the Bulgarians had control of all of East Macedonia and part of West Macedonia, and had begun a process of ethnic cleansing, expelling all of the Greeks. Only the presence of the Armées alliées en Orient prevented the Bulgarians from taking all of Macedonia. The Bulgarian occupation and the ethnic cleansing of Macedonia was considered to be intolerable, and finally certain Greek Army officers started to consider breaking their oaths to serve the king under the grounds if Constantine was unwilling to defend Greece, then they had a higher loyalty to defend Greece.

=== Breakout of the National Defence government ===
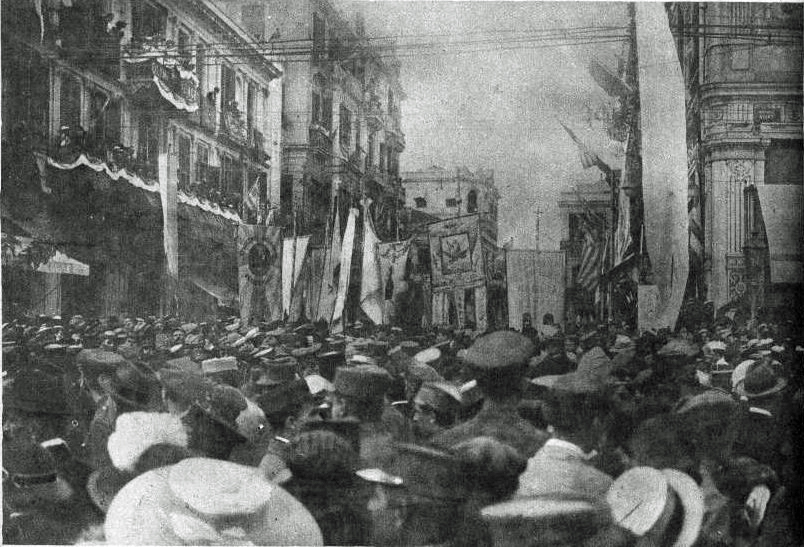
Proclamation of the Venizelist government in Thessaloniki, September 1916

August 30, 1916, saw a coup against the Royalist government by the "National Defence" (Εθνική Άμυνα), a secret pro-Venizelist military organization based in Thessaloniki by Venizelist officers, aiming to defend the Macedonian territory. The principal reason given for the coup was the desire to defend Greek Macedonia from the Bulgarians, and since the king was unwilling to do that, they had decided to take matters into their own hands. The coup succeeded to the extent that a second provisional government of Greece was formed by the group in Thessaloniki. The coup had occurred without Venizelos's knowledge, and he initially disapproved of a course of action that set Greece for a civil war. Venizelos, having worked hard to achieve an enosis of Crete with Greece, was not keen on breaking up Greece. Only after much thought and deliberation did he decide to join the movement in Thessaloniki.

With the backing of the Entente, Venizelos returned to the Greek mainland from Crete to lead the new provisional government at the head of a triumvirate on 9 October 1916. He declared: "We are not against the King, but against the Bulgarians". Joining Venizelos in leading the new government were General Panagiotis Danglis and Admiral Pavlos Kountouriotis. The people on the islands of Crete, Samos, Mytilini and Chios promptly declared their support for Venizelos and soon the revolutionary government had control of all the islands in the Aegean Sea except for the Cyclades (which were part of "Old Greece", and therefore royalist). Gendarmes from Crete played a significant role in providing manpower for the revolutionary government, leading them to be hailed in Thessaloniki as the "Antigone of Greece". The first declaration of the revolutionary government reads:

A policy, that we won't examine its motives, during the last one and a half year brought so many disasters, that everybody wonders if Greece today is the same state as before. The Palace listening to bad advisers and applying a personal policy, [sought to have] Greece to step away from her traditional allies and to approach her traditional enemies.

Upon his arrival in Thessaloniki, Venizelos, in a speech, argued that the war was a struggle for freedom and for the right of small nations to exist peacefully. Venizelos found himself having to organise and create a government with only the resources of the islands and part of Macedonia to pay for it all. Despite expectations, Britain and France were slow to support the new government, and only on 20 October 1916 was it announced that Britain and France would subsidise the Thessaloniki government. Despite Venizelos's best effort to appear moderate, many people, especially in "Old Greece", saw the revolutionary government as the beginning of social breakdown. The King in Athens saw the National Defence as an anti-monarchist coup with "the support of Republican France".

By 1916, the Greek population had polarized to such an extent that neutrality was no longer possible, and everyone had to take a stand. Because the Orthodox church supported the king, the Venizelist movement took on an anti-clerical character. Opposition to Greece's joining the war led the socialist movement to support Constantine.

National Defence Army Corps were created to support the Allies at the Macedonian front. This army consisted mostly of volunteers, but in many cases the Venizelist officers of the Defence used violence in their territory against deserters or royalists, or even clergy who supported Constantine, leading to bloody events (Naxos, Chalkidiki, etc.).

The royalist governments in Athens, meanwhile, continued to negotiate with the Allies a possible entry in the war, with Constantine asking from them to not recognize the Venizelist government, while the Venizelists from Thessaloniki insisted that Constantine was deluding them and had no intention to join the war.

=== Noemvriana ===
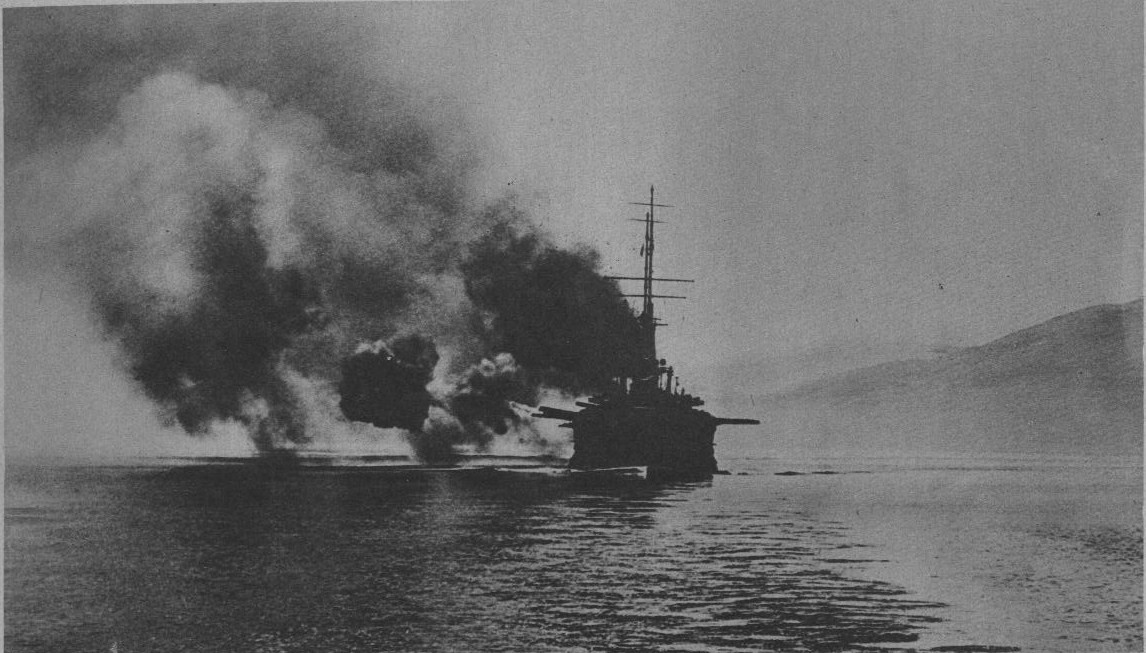
The French battleship Mirabeau bombarding Athens during the November events

In retaliation against the "National Defence" coup, a royalist paramilitary unit called the "Reservists" (Epistratoi-Επίστρατοι) was formed, in a number of Greek cities, led by Colonel Ioannis Metaxas (one of Constantine's closest aides and a future dictator of Greece). The Reservists, whose men were largely of lower-middle class origin, was an ultra-nationalist group that displayed proto-fascist tendencies. The uniformed Pan-Hellenic Reservists were the first mass movement in modern Greek history, and also marked the beginning of an embrace of violence as part of the political process. The Greek historian Kostas Kostis wrote that the legacy of violence caused by the Balkan Wars "...helps explain with which they resorted to violence, even against their own compatriots: the Venizelists were merely enemies, much like the Bulgarians and the Turks. The fact that these opponents were unarmed citizens was of little importance." The group targeted Venizelist people in Athens and nearby areas, culminating in the Noemvriana, the "November events", which were ignited by an armed confrontation between Greek reservists and French marines. The Noemvriana left about 60 dead on the Allied side and 40 dead on the Greek side. Afterwards, a reign of terror was launched by the Reservists against the Venizelists in Athens. During the Noemvriana, refugees from Anatolia (who had escaped persecution by the Turks) living in Athens were attacked by the Reservists as Venizelists. The attacks and murders against the refugees contributed to the identification of the refugees with Venizelism, and in the 1920s the refugees were one of the strongest Venizelist voting blocs.

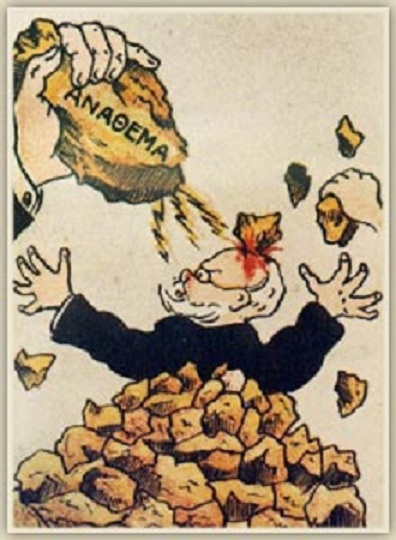
Antivenizelist poster on the "Anathema", December 1916

Royalist demonstrations broke out in "Old Greece" and the Orthodox Church at the orders of the king anathematised Venizelos as a traitor. Anathemas such as these reflected the intense feelings that divided Greece by 1916. The anathema by the Orthodox bishop of Patras against Venizelos read:

Cursed, Anathema to your family who soiled Greece with you. Anathema to your father who helped give you birth. Anathema to your mother who held such a snake in her womb...and to forever remain in the darkness of our religion, which you did not respect...to not find someone to close your eyes, even dead, to have your eyes open, so that you continue watching the country you betrayed. Anathema to your soul. Anathema to the chaos it [soul] will fall. Anathema to its memory. Anathema to you.

On the other side, feelings were just as intense. Lambros Koromilas, the Greek ambassador in Rome sent a public letter to the King stating:

The obscure and ambiguous policy which Your Governments have pursued for over a year has led us to hostilities with our natural friends, the Powers of the Entente, whom we have so frequently assures of our good friendship, whilst—the most amazing thing—this same policy has driven us to non-resistance against the Bulgarians, our hereditary enemies, when they came and captured our forts, our Macedonian towns, half our war supplies and our soldiers.

At the same time (November 1916), the National Defence Army attacked the Royalist Army at Katerini aiming to capture Thessaly. This was the only battle between the armies of the two governments.

After the "Noemvriana", towards the end of 1916, France and Britain, after failing to persuade the royalist government to enter the war, officially recognized the "National Defence" government as the lawful government of Greece. Ιn retaliation, the "National Defence" government and the Entente instituted a naval blockade, seized the royalist fleet and demanded the partial disarmament of the royalist forces and their withdrawal to the Peloponnese.

The monarchists blamed Venizelos as the one behind the idea of the blockade. It lasted 106 days, during which time no goods were allowed to enter or leave royalist-controlled ports under the control of the Athens government (Peloponnese, Cyclades, and Central Greece), leading the population of Athens to starve. The events of Noemvriana were a pivotal moment in the National Schism, which caused a profound social rift in Greek society and set a precedent for much of the future conflict in Greece.

== Official Greek entry in the war ==
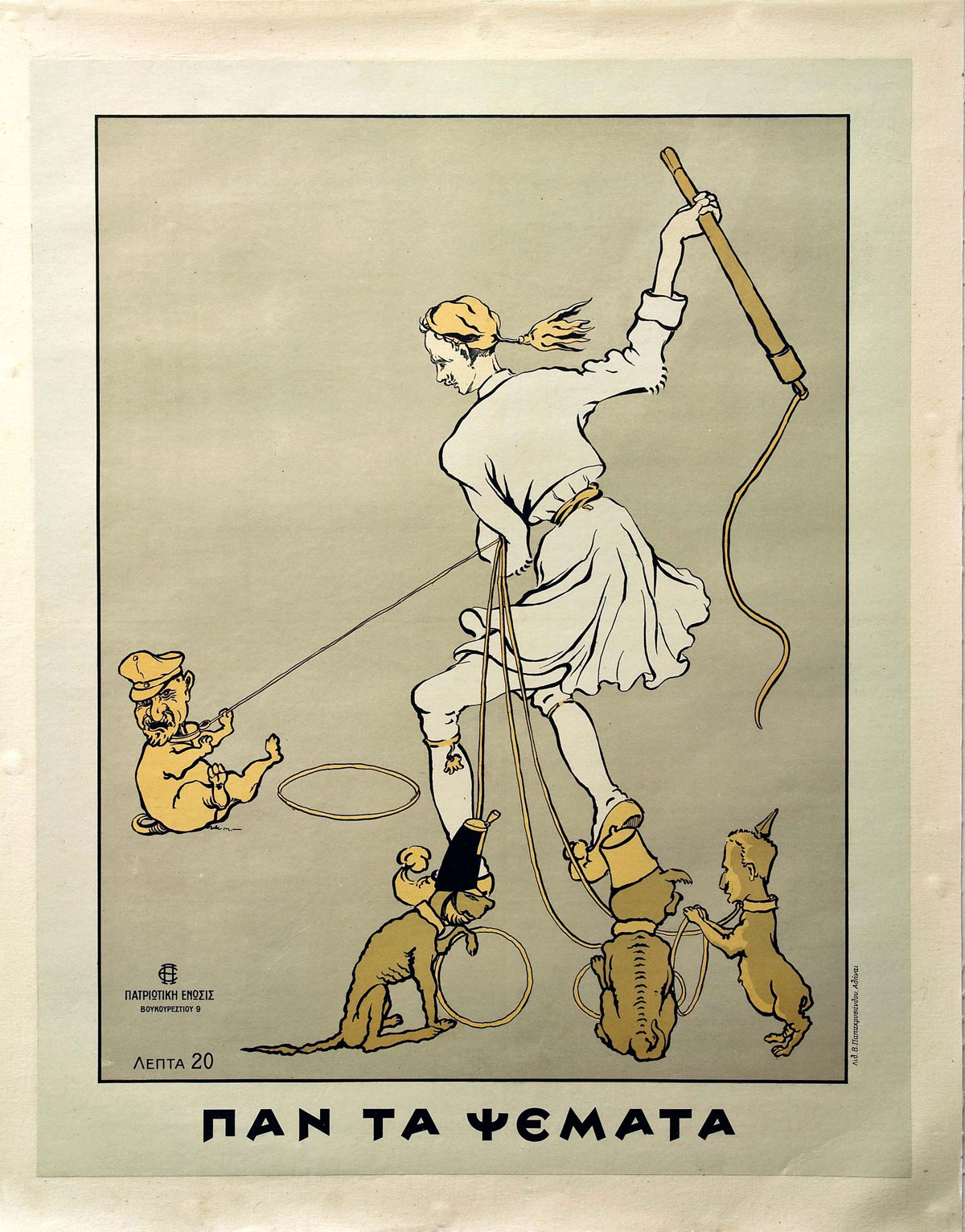
Greek war poster showing an Evzone against the Central powers; "The lies are at an end!" The dog that the Evzone is striking bears the face of King Ferdinand of Bulgaria.

The Venizelist-Entente blockade eventually succeeded in its aim. In June 1917, the French captured Thessaly, and after threats to bombard Athens if the King remained, Constantine left Greece on 14 June 1917, leaving the Crown to his second son Alexander. Constantine was a popular king, at least in "Old Greece", and his departure was the scene of much sorrow in Athens. The royal chronicler Zavitzianos wrote: "Never was dethroned a more popular King". Venizelos took control of the government and pledged Greek support to the Entente. On 29 June 1917, Greece broke off diplomatic relations with Germany, the Austrian Empire, Bulgaria, and the Ottoman Empire. In July, the country officially declared war on the Central Powers. Most of the political opponents of Venizelos were exiled to Corsica (Metaxas, Gounaris, Dousmanis, and others), were put in internal exile or placed under house arrest. To the protests by the new King against the prosecutions, Venizelos replied: "These people are not politicians. They are criminals".

Venizelos reestablished the parliament since the existing one was considered unconstitutional. This was followed by purging antivenizelists from the state bureaucracy, military, and clergy. The Venizelists quickly proved to be just as willing to persecute their opponents as the royalists had done previously.

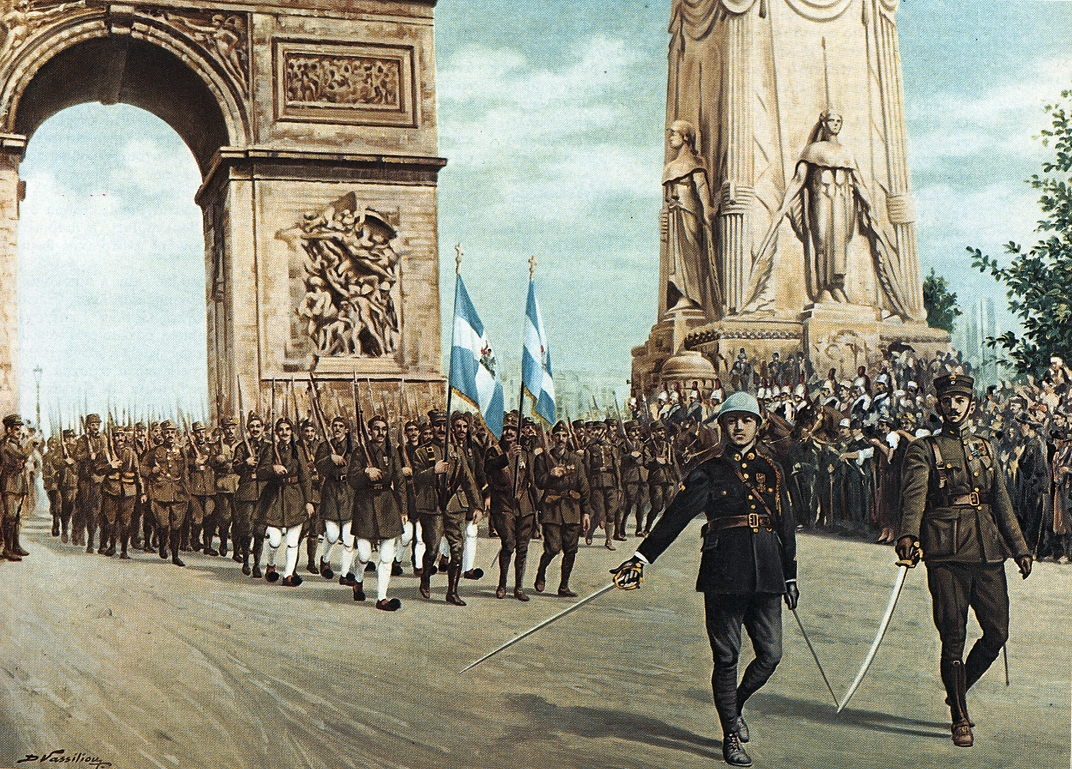
Painting depicting Greek military units in the World War I Victory Parade in Arc de Triomphe, Paris. July 1919.

During the remaining 18 months of the war, 10 divisions of the Greek army fought alongside the Allied forces against Bulgarian and German forces in Macedonia and Bulgaria. The presence of the entire Greek army gave the critical mass that altered the balance between the opponents on the Macedonian front. Under the command of French General Franchet d'Espèrey, a combined Greek, Serbian, French, and British force launched a major offensive against the Bulgarian and German army, starting on 14 September 1918. After the first heavy fighting (see Battle of Skra), the Bulgarians gave up their defensive positions and began retreating towards their country. On 24 September, the Bulgarian government asked for an armistice, which was signed five days later. The Allied army then pushed north and defeated the remaining German and Austrian forces that tried to halt the Allied offensive. By October 1918, the Allied armies had recaptured all of Serbia and prepared to invade Hungary. The offensive was halted because the Hungarian leadership offered to surrender in November 1918, marking the Austro-Hungarian empire's dissolution. The breaking of the Macedonian front was one of the important breakthroughs of the military stalemate and helped to end the War. Greece was granted a seat under Venizelos at the Paris Peace Conference.

== Consequences ==
The act of entering the war and the preceding events resulted in a deep political and social division in post-World War I Greece. The country's foremost political formations, the Venizelist Liberals and the Royalists, already involved in a long and bitter rivalry over pre-war politics, reached a state of outright hatred towards each other. Both parties viewed the other's actions during the First World War as politically illegitimate and treasonous. Constantine I, while in exile in Switzerland, continued to oppose the Greek participation in the war and to influence his supporters.

After the end of the war, the Venizelists published a "White Bible" (Λευκή Βίβλος), an album with all the treasonous, according to their opinion, actions of the royalists. In 1919, the trial of the General Staff ("trial of the officers of GES") took place, regarding the surrender of Fort Rupel, the Noemvriana events, and the loan of 1915 from Germany. Many officers were convicted (including Dousmanis and Metaxas in absentia) together with as former prime minister Stefanos Skouloudis.

On the other side, the royalists opposed the Venizelist governance since 1917 as "dictatorial". In August 1920, an assassination attempt on Venizelos took place in Paris by two royalist ex-officers after the signing of the Treaty of Sevres. The next day, a Venizelist crowd in Athens, believing Venizelos was killed, attacked offices and enterprises of antivenizelists, while Ion Dragoumis was murdered. Venizelos testified during the trial of the officers in France.

During the November elections of 1920, Penelope Delta described the shouts of the pro-royalist crowd in Athens: "We don't want them!" (the new lands gained by the Treaty of Sevres) and "Long live the Koumparos!" (a nickname of Constantine). With the return of Constantine, most of the officers that had participated in the National Defence were dismissed from the army, or left by own (Kondylis etc.) and fled to Constantinople, where formed the "Democratic Defence", a military organization which criticized the actions of Constantine and the new royalist governments.

This enmity inevitably spread throughout the Greek society, inside the Army and creating so a deep rift that contributed decisively to the Asia Minor Disaster, the 1922 Revolution and the Trial of the Six, and resulted in continued political and military unrest in the interwar years during the troubled Second Hellenic Republic. A new assassination attempt of Venizelos took place in 1933, while the Venizelists attempted a coup in 1935. The National Schism was also one of the principal causes that led to the collapse of the Republic and the institution of the dictatorial 4th of August Regime in 1936.

As the nation polarized, the political fortunes of the great families were destroyed with each turn of the wheel. Particularly damaging was the existence of duplicate civil services and militaries, which increased the competition for government jobs. Additionally, the National Schism had encouraged the politicization of the military that had begun with the 1909 coup, and from 1916 onward, the military was divided between Venizelists and royalists, settling the stage for the frequent coups and attempted coups of the interwar period. The politicization of the Army led many officers to see themselves as the final arbiters of politics. More importantly, the National Schism had "legitimised the use of violence", and throughout the interwar period, political violence frequently marred the scene. The increasing breakdown of social norms alongside the acceptance of violence as legitimate also led to calls for a fascist style dictatorship, and Kostis noted that Benito Mussolini was a much admired figure in the 1920s–30s Greece. The popularity of Mussolini occurred despite his irredentist policies as claimed parts of Greece such as the Ionian islands because they had once belonged to Venice.

The division between Royalists and Venizelists even came to the United States and elsewhere with the Greek immigrants of that generation: immigrants favouring the two political camps would settle in nearby but carefully separated communities in American cities, often centred on competing Greek Orthodox parishes. In some cases, the animosity and mistrust between such parishes have survived into the 21st century, long after the original political disagreement was forgotten.

Moments after Noemvriana
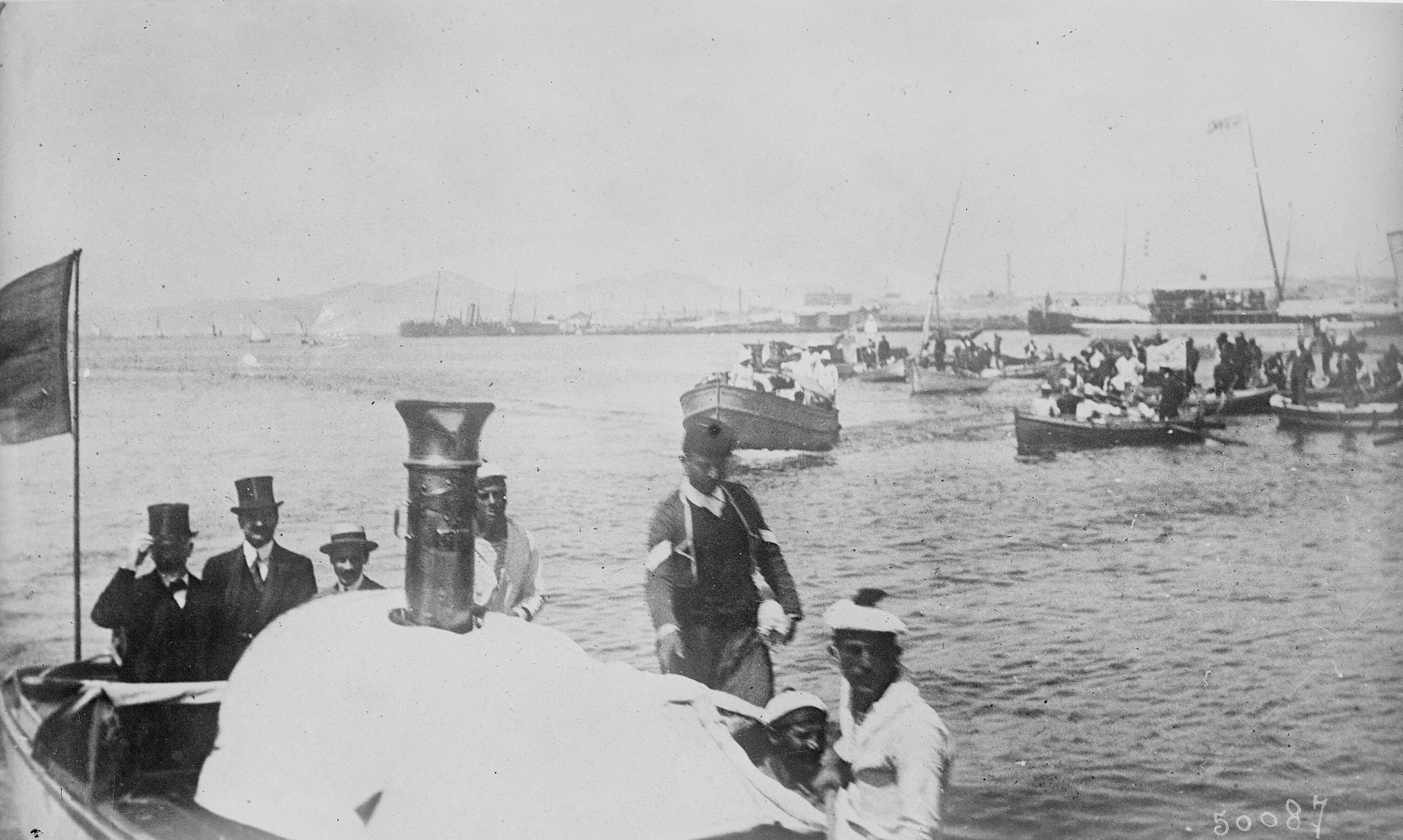
The arrival of Venizelos to Athens with French ships, June 1917, after the departure of Constantine

Prince Alexander is sworn in as King of Greece after the abdication and departure of his father in June 1917. Venizelos is present on the podium, to the King's right.

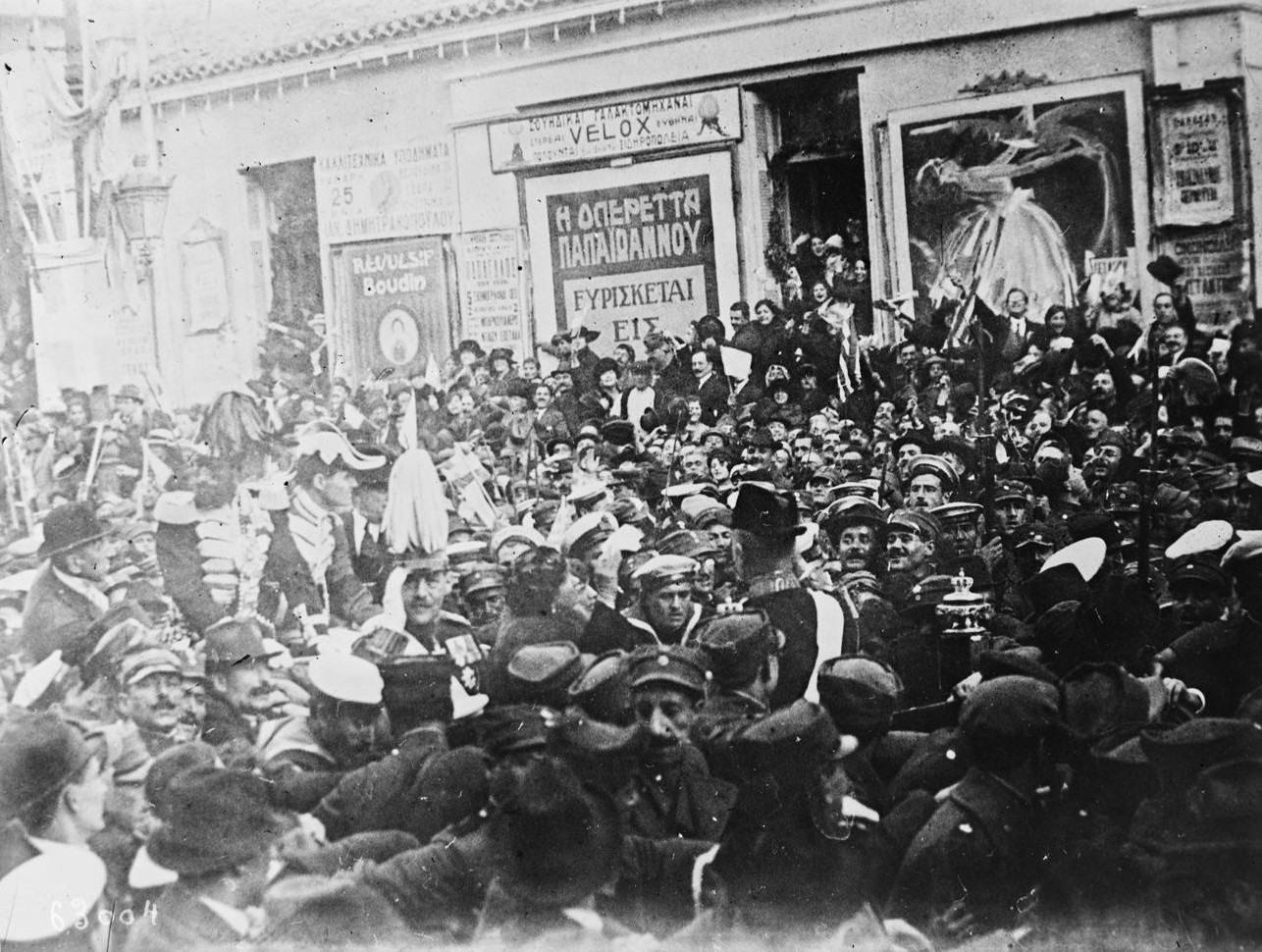
Return of Constantine, December 1920

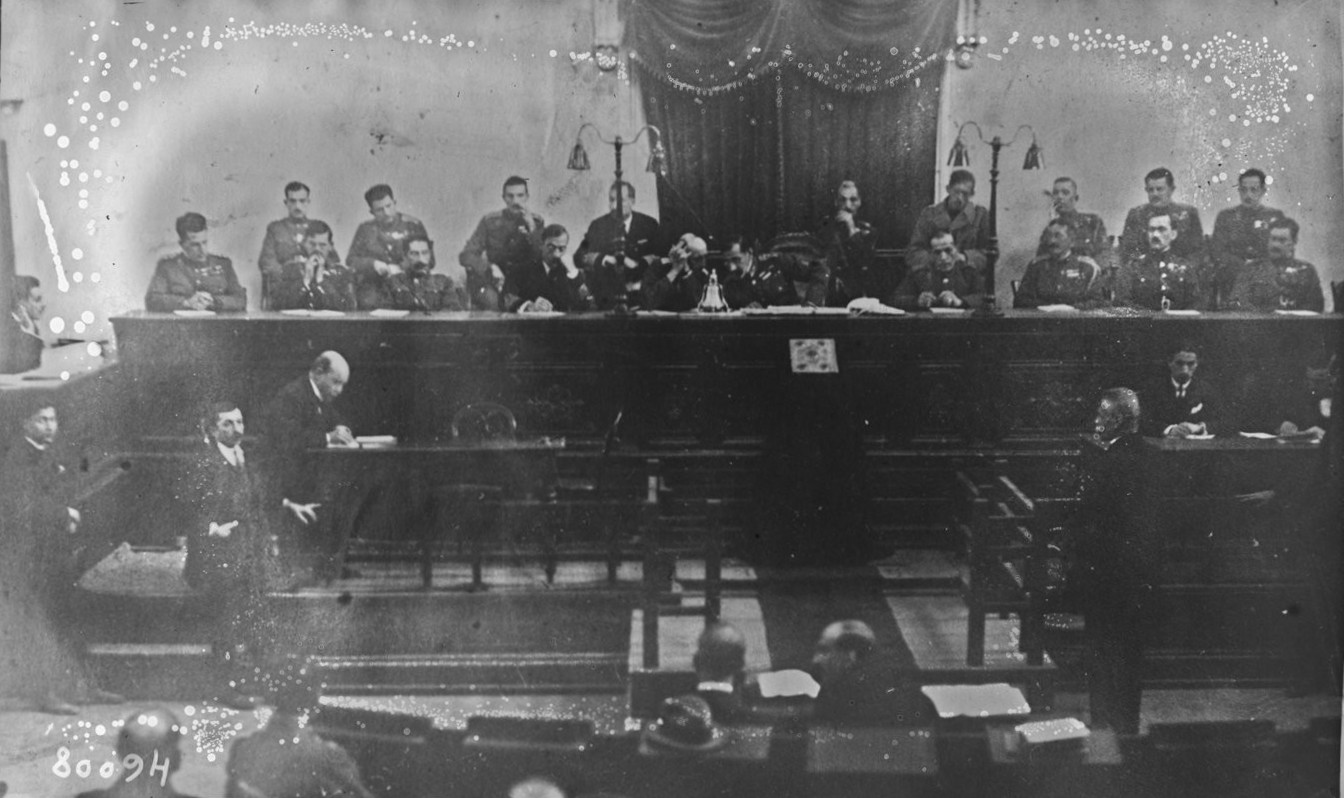
Photo from the "trial of the six" in late 1922
