= Magnesia Prefecture =

Magnesia Prefecture Νομός Μαγνησίας
- Former prefecture
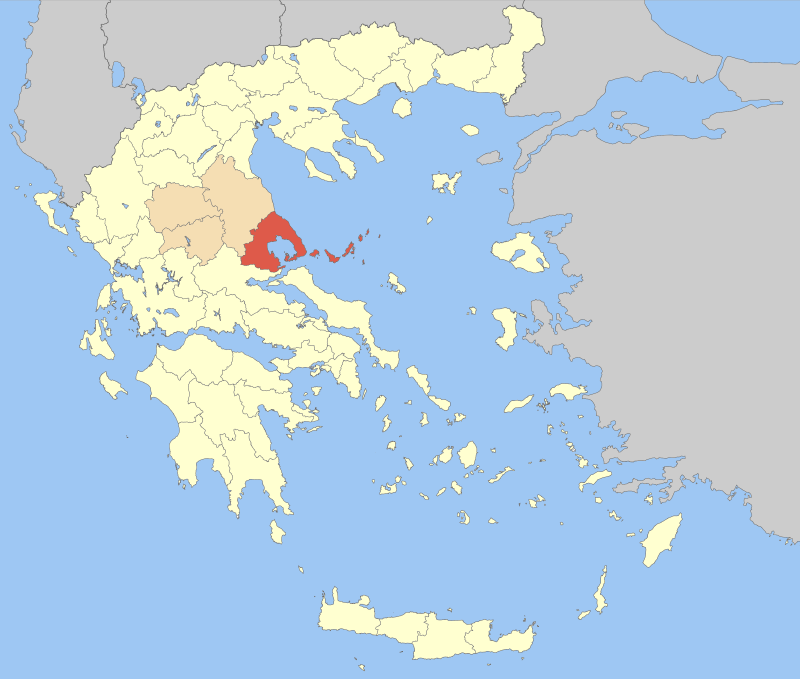
- Location of Magnesia Prefecture in Greece
- Country: Greece
- Periphery: Thessaly
- Established: 1899
- Disestablished: 2011
- Capital: Volos

Area
  - Total: 2,367 km^{2} (914 sq mi)
  - Rank: List of the prefectures of Greece by area

Population (2001)
  - Total: 193,439
  - Rank: List of the prefectures of Greece by population
  - Density: 81.72/km^{2} (211.7/sq mi)

Magnesia Prefecture (Greek: Νομός Μαγνησίας) was one of the prefectures of Greece. Its capital was Volos. It was established in 1899 from the Larissa Prefecture. The prefecture was disbanded on 1 January 2011 by the Kallikratis programme, and split into the regional units of Magnesia and the Sporades.

The toponym is ancient to the region. Ore that attracts iron is common in Magnesia, which is the origin of words such as magnet and magnetism as well as the chemical elements magnesium, derived from the mineral magnesia alba, and manganese, derived from the mineral magnesia nigra via Latin.
