= Chief of the Hellenic Navy General Staff =

- Αρχηγός του Γενικού Επιτελείου Ναυτικού

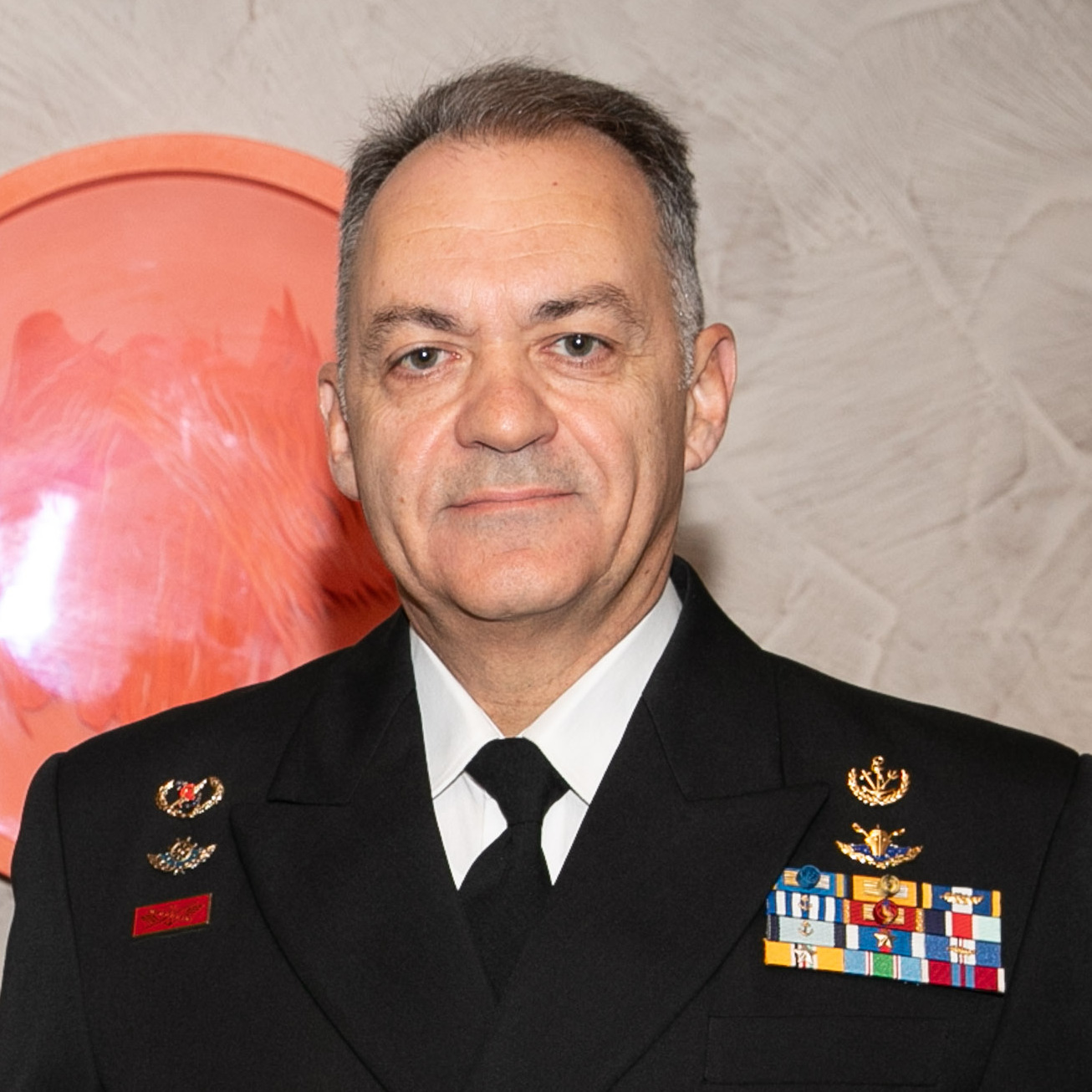
- Incumbent; Vice Admiral Dimitrios E. Kataras since 12 January 2024
- Hellenic Navy General Staff
- Abbreviation: Α/ΓΕΝ
- Member of: Hellenic Navy
- Reports to: Chief of the National Defence General Staff
- Seat: Hellenic National Defence General Staff
- Formation: 13 December 1907
- First holder: Georgios A. Kountouriotis

The Chief of the Hellenic Navy General Staff (Greek: Αρχηγός του Γενικού Επιτελείου Ναυτικού, romanized: Archigós tou Genikoú Epiteleíou Naftikoú, abbrev. Α/ΓΕΝ) is the head of the Hellenic Navy General Staff and commander of the Hellenic Navy. The position is customarily held by a three-star flag officer (vice admiral). As part of Greece's membership in NATO, from 1967 until 1999 the Chief of the HNGS was also commander of NATO's COMEDEAST.

== List of chiefs ==
| No. | Portrait | Chief of the Navy General Staff | Took office | Left office | Time in office |
|---|---|---|---|---|---|
| 1 | Georgios A. Kountouriotis [el] | Captain; Georgios A. Kountouriotis (1851–1908) | 13 December 1907 | 10 July 1908 | 210 days |
| 2 | Alexandros Sachtouris [el] | Rear Admiral; Alexandros Sachtouris (1851–1926) | 10 July 1908 | 3 August 1911 | 3 years, 24 days |
| 3 | Petros Ginis [el] | Captain; Petros Ginis (1861–1935) (Note: MP for Spetses (1910, 1915), Senator (1932–33)) | 07 January 1911 | 15 April 1912 | 1 year, 99 days |
| 4 | Pavlos Kountouriotis | Rear Admiral; Pavlos Kountouriotis (1855–1935) (Note: Commander of the Aegean Fleet during the Balkan Wars (1912–13), Commander's Cross of the Cross of Valour (1914), Member of the "Triumvirate of National Defence" (1916–17), Regent (1920), First President of the Second Hellenic Republic (1924–29)) | 16 April 1912 | 16 September 1912 | 153 days |
| 5 | Matthaios Matthaiopoulos [el] | Captain; Matthaios Matthaiopoulos (1870–1921) | 16 September 1912 | 7 April 1914 | 1 year, 203 days |
| 6 | Dimitrios Papachristos | Rear Admiral; Dimitrios Papachristos (1867–1949) (Note: Senator (1929–35)) | 14 April 1914 | 16 June 1914 | 63 days |
| 7 | Sofoklis Dousmanis | Rear Admiral; Sofoklis Dousmanis (1868–1952) (Note: Minister for Naval Affairs (1935)) | 19 June 1914 | 14 June 1917 | 2 years, 360 days |
| 8 | Georgios Kakoulidis | Captain; Georgios Kakoulidis (1871–1946) (Note: MP and Senator, Governor-General of Thrace) | 22 June 1917 | 18 December 1917 | 179 days |
| 9 | Dimitrios Papachristos | Rear Admiral; Dimitrios Papachristos (1867–1949) | 18 December 1917 | 22 June 1920 | 2 years, 187 days |
| 10 | Ioannis Ipitis | Rear Admiral; Ioannis Ipitis (1867–1956) (Note: Vice-Minister for Naval Affairs (1950)) | 9 November 1920 | 26 April 1921 | 168 days |
| 11 | Konstantinos Malikopoulos | Rear Admiral; Konstantinos Malikopoulos (1872–1945) | 29 April 1921 | 15 December 1921 | 230 days |
| 12 | Sofoklis Dousmanis | Rear Admiral; Sofoklis Dousmanis (1868–1952) | 15 December 1921 | 12 October 1922 | 301 days |
| 13 | Agisilaos Gerontas [el] | Captain; Agisilaos Gerontas (1873–1962) | 12 October 1922 | 11 March 1924 | 1 year, 151 days |
| 14 | Anastasios Gonatas | Captain; Anastasios Gonatas (1877–1957) | 11 March 1924 | 24 March 1924 | 13 days |
| 15 | Vikentios Loprestis [el] | Rear Admiral; Vikentios Loprestis (1872–1953) | 24 March 1924 | 8 July 1925 | 1 year, 106 days |
| 16 | Anastasios Gonatas | Captain; Anastasios Gonatas (1877–1957) | 8 July 1925 | 27 February 1926 | 234 days |
| 17 | Christos Louis | Captain; Christos Louis (1877–1957) (Note: Minister for Communications (1945)) | 27 February 1926 | 7 July 1926 | 130 days |
| 18 | Ioannis Demestichas | Captain; Ioannis Demestichas (1882–1960) (Note: 1st term; Minister for Aviation and Naval Affairs (1933), Minister for the Interior, Education, and Mercantile Marine (1944)) | 7 July 1926 | 3 October 1926 | 88 days |
| 19 | Christos Louis | Captain; Christos Louis (1877–1957) | 3 October 1926 | 1 December 1926 | 59 days |
| 20 | Ioannis Demestichas | Captain; Ioannis Demestichas (1882–1960) | 1 December 1926 | 17 February 1927 | 78 days |
| 21 | Konstantinos Typaldos-Alfonsatos | Rear Admiral; Konstantinos Typaldos-Alfonsatos (1873–1945) (Note: Minister for Naval Affairs (1922)) | 17 February 1927 | 15 July 1927 | 148 days |
| 22 | Konstantinos Malikopoulos | Rear Admiral; Konstantinos Malikopoulos (1872–1945) | 15 July 1927 | 7 December 1928 | 1 year, 145 days |
| 23 | Georgios Panas | Rear Admiral; Georgios Panas (1876–1939) | 7 December 1928 | 18 February 1931 | 2 years, 73 days |
| 24 | Christos Louis | Captain; Christos Louis (1877–1957) | 18 February 1931 | 7 December 1931 | 292 days |
| 25 | Periklis Dimoulis | Rear Admiral; Periklis Dimoulis (1880–1945) | 7 December 1931 | 10 December 1932 | 1 year, 3 days |
| 26 | Ioannis Demestichas | Captain; Ioannis Demestichas (1882–1960) | 10 December 1932 | 6 March 1933 | 86 days |
| 27 | Christos Louis | Captain; Christos Louis (1877–1957) | 6 March 1933 | 9 March 1933 | 3 days |
| 28 | Periklis Dimoulis | Rear Admiral; Periklis Dimoulis (1880–1945) | 9 March 1933 | 17 August 1933 | 161 days |
| 29 | Epameinondas Kavvadias | Captain; Epameinondas Kavvadias (1886–1965) (Note: Fleet Commander (1941–42), Vice-Minister for Naval Affairs (1942–43), Commander's Cross of the Cross of Valour (1947)) | 23 August 1933 | 17 July 1934 | 328 days |
| 30 | Periklis Dimoulis | Rear Admiral; Periklis Dimoulis (1880–1945) | 17 July 1934 | 3 March 1935 | 229 days |
| 31 | Dimitrios Oikonomou | Vice Admiral; Dimitrios Oikonomou (1883–1957) | 3 March 1935 | 19 December 1936 | 1 year, 291 days |
| 32 | Epameinondas Kavvadias | Captain; Epameinondas Kavvadias (1886–1965) | 19.12.1936 | 12.01.1937 | 24 days |
| 33 | Alexandros Sakellariou | Rear Admiral; Alexandros Sakellariou (1887–1982) | 12.01.1937 | 13.08.1938 | 1 year, 213 days |
| 34 | Epameinondas Kavvadias | Rear Admiral; Epameinondas Kavvadias (1886–1965) | 13.08.1938 | 17.09.1938 | 35 days |
| 35 | Alexandros Sakellariou | Rear Admiral; Alexandros Sakellariou (1887–1982) | 17.09.1938 | 20.04.1941 | 2 years, 215 days |
| 36 | Charalambos Delagrammatikas | Rear Admiral; Charalambos Delagrammatikas (1887–1947) | 26.04.1941 | 30.04.1941 | 4 days |
| 37 | Petros Voulgaris | Vice Admiral; Petros Voulgaris (1883–1957) | 03.09.1944 | 11.04.1945 | 220 days |
| 38 | Grigorios Mezeviris | Vice Admiral; Grigorios Mezeviris | 11.04.1945 | 14.10.1946 | 1 year, 186 days |
| 39 | Alfredos Leontopoulos | Rear Admiral; Alfredos Leontopoulos | 14.10.1946 | 02.02.1947 | 111 days |
| 40 | Grigorios Mezeviris | Vice Admiral; Grigorios Mezeviris | 02.02.1947 | 20.09.1947 | 230 days |
| 41 | Periklis Antonopoulos | Vice Admiral; Periklis Antonopoulos | 20.09.1947 | 17.11.1951 | 4 years, 58 days |
| 42 | Panagiotis Konstas | Rear Admiral; Panagiotis Konstas | 17.11.1951 | 06.09.1952 | 294 days |
| 43 | Pyrros Lappas | Vice Admiral; Pyrros Lappas (1899–1981) | 06.09.1952 | 13.09.1958 | 6 years, 7 days |
| 44 | Konstantinos Tsatsos | Vice Admiral; Konstantinos Tsatsos | 13.09.1958 | 04.12.1959 | 1 year, 82 days |
| 45 | Georgios Panagiotopoulos | Vice Admiral; Georgios Panagiotopoulos | 4.12.1959 | 27.11.1961 | 1 year, 358 days |
| 46 | Dimitrios Kiosses | Vice Admiral; Dimitrios Kiosses | 27.11.1961 | 12.12.1963 | 2 years, 15 days |
| 47 | Spyridon Avgeris | Vice Admiral; Spyridon Avgeris (1909–1972) | 12.12.1963 | 30.03.1967 | 3 years, 108 days |
| 48 | Konstantinos Engolfopoulos | Vice Admiral; Konstantinos Engolfopoulos (1912–1991) | 30.03.1967 | 24.04.1967 | 25 days |
| 49 | Ippokratis Dedes | Vice Admiral; Ippokratis Dedes | 24.04.1967 | 13.12.1967 | 233 days |
| 50 | Stavros Pervainas | Vice Admiral; Stavros Pervainas | 13.12.1967 | 18.12.1968 | 1 year, 5 days |
| 51 | Konstantinos Margaritis | Vice Admiral; Konstantinos Margaritis | 18.12.1968 | 01.06.1973 | 4 years, 165 days |
| 52 | Petros Arapakis | Vice Admiral; Petros Arapakis | 01.06.1973 | 08.01.1975 | 1 year, 221 days |
| 53 | Konstantinos Engolfopoulos | Vice Admiral; Konstantinos Engolfopoulos (1912–1991) | 08.01.1975 | 08.01.1976 | 1 year, 0 days |
| 54 | Spyridon Mourkis | Vice Admiral; Spyridon Mourkis | 08.01.1976 | 16.09.1976 | 252 days |
| 55 | Spyridon Konofaos | Vice Admiral; Spyridon Konofaos | 16.09.1976 | 05.01.1982 | 5 years, 111 days |
| 56 | Odysseas Kapetos | Vice Admiral; Odysseas Kapetos | 05.01.1982 | 23.03.1982 | 77 days |
| 57 | Nikolaos Pappas | Vice Admiral; Nikolaos Pappas (1930–2013) | 23.03.1982 | 22.12.1986 | 4 years, 274 days |
| 58 | Leonidas Vasilikopoulos | Vice Admiral; Leonidas Vasilikopoulos (1932–2014) | 22.12.1986 | 17.07.1989 | 2 years, 207 days |
| 59 | Evangelos Lagaras | Vice Admiral; Evangelos Lagaras | 17.07.1989 | 28.02.1992 | 2 years, 226 days |
| 60 | Iraklis Drikos | Vice Admiral; Iraklis Drikos | 28.02.1992 | 17.12.1993 | 1 year, 292 days |
| 61 | Ioannis Stagas | Vice Admiral; Ioannis Stagas | 17.12.1993 | 16.02.1996 | 2 years, 61 days |
| 62 | Leonidas Paliogiorgos | Vice Admiral; Leonidas Paliogiorgos | 16.02.1996 | 16.02.1998 | 2 years, 0 days |
| 63 | Georgios Ioannidis | Vice Admiral; Georgios Ioannidis | 16.02.1998 | 15.02.2001 | 2 years, 365 days |
| 64 | Georgios Theodoroulakis | Vice Admiral; Georgios Theodoroulakis | 16.02.2001 | 05.03.2002 | 1 year, 17 days |
| 65 | Antonis Antoniadis | Vice Admiral; Antonis Antoniadis (born 1946) | 05.03.2002 | 15.02.2005 | 2 years, 347 days |
| 66 | Dimitrios Gousis | Vice Admiral; Dimitrios Gousis | 15.02.2005 | 5.02.2008 | 2 years, 355 days |
| 67 | Georgios Karamalikis | Vice Admiral; Georgios Karamalikis | 05.02.2008 | 17.02.2010 | 2 years, 12 days |
| 68 | Dimitrios Elefsiniotis | Vice Admiral; Dimitrios Elefsiniotis | 17.02.2010 | 01.11.2011 | 1 year, 257 days |
| 69 | Kosmas Christidis | Vice Admiral; Kosmas Christidis | 01.11.2011 | 07.03.2013 | 1 year, 126 days |
| 70 | Evangelos Apostolakis | Vice Admiral; Evangelos Apostolakis (born 1957) | 07.03.2013 | 16.09.2015 | 2 years, 193 days |
| 71 | Georgios Giakoumakis | Vice Admiral; Georgios Giakoumakis (born 1959) | 16.09.2015 | 16.01.2017 | 1 year, 122 days |
| 72 | Nikolaos Tsounis | Vice Admiral; Nikolaos Tsounis | 16.01.2017 | 17.01.2020 | 3 years, 1 day |
| 73 | Stylianos Petrakis | Vice Admiral; Stylianos Petrakis | 17.01.2020 | 16.01.2023 | 2 years, 364 days |
| 74 | Ioannis Drymousis | Vice Admiral; Ioannis Drymousis | 16.01.2023 | 12 January 2024 | 361 days |
| 75 | | Vice Admiral; Dimitrios-Eleftherios Kataras (born 1965) | 12 January 2024 | Incumbent | 2 years, 238 days |

== Sources ==
- "Διατελέσαντες Αρχηγοί ΓΕΝ" (in Greek). Hellenic Navy. Archived from the original on 9 September 2018.
