= Dimitrios Oikonomou =

Greek Navy admiral (1883-1957)

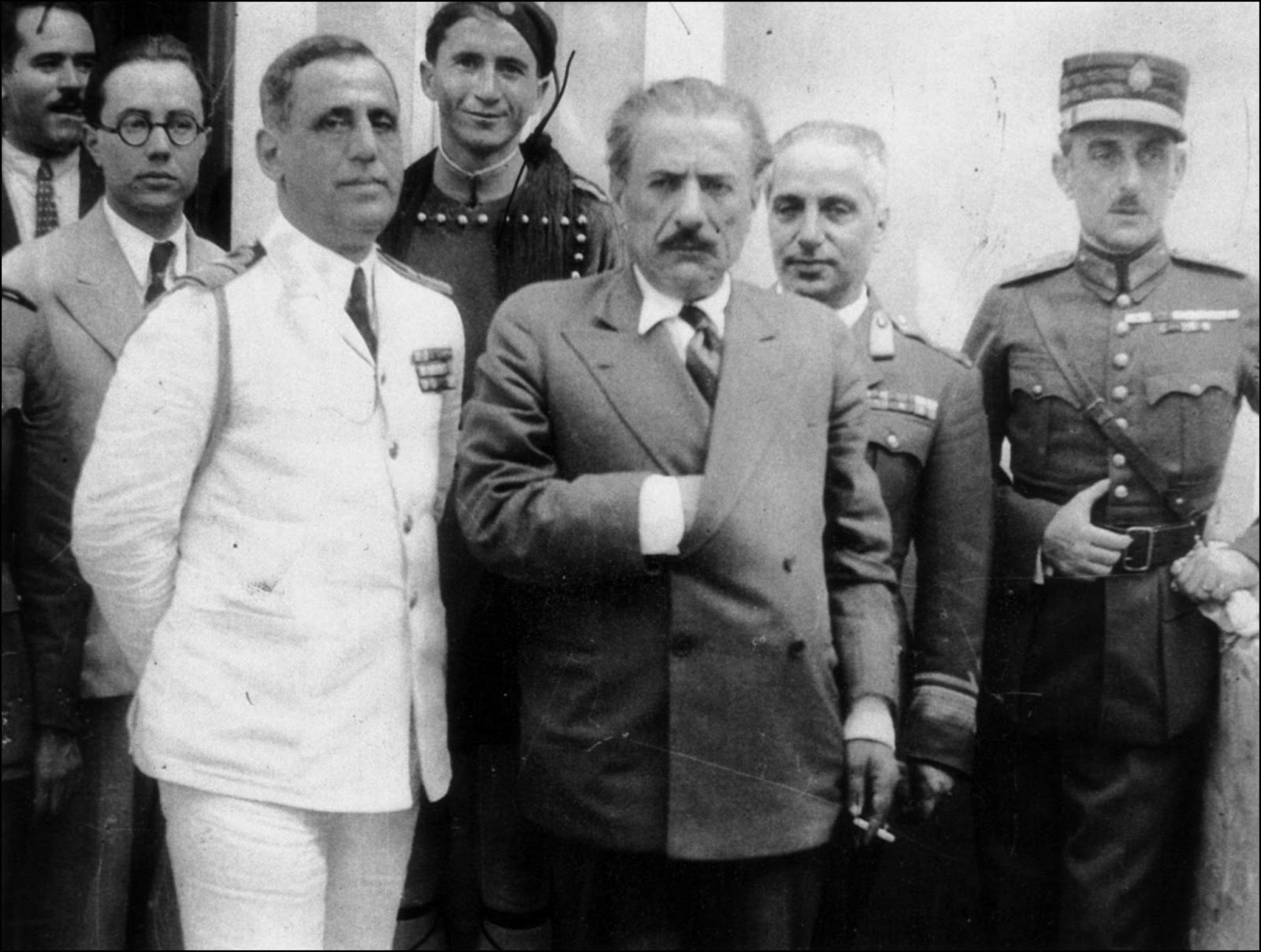
- Oikonomou (in white, left) with Kondylis, Reppas and Papagos on 11 October 1935, after the overthrow of the Second Hellenic Republic
- Born: 4 June 1883; Chalcis, Greece
- Died: 11 September 1957 (aged 74); Syros, Greece
- Military career
- Allegiance: Greece
- Branch: Hellenic Navy
- Service years: 1899–1917, 1920–1947
- Rank: Vice Admiral
- Conflicts: Balkan Wars, World War II
- Awards: War Cross 1st Class

Dimitrios Oikonomou (Greek: Δημήτριος Οικονόμου; 4 June 1883 – 11 September 1957) was a Hellenic Navy admiral. After fighting as a junior officer in the Balkan Wars, he was a convinced royalist and was dismissed from service in 1917–20. Reinstated, he held various ship and senior commands during the interwar period, including serving as Chief of the Hellenic Navy General Staff in 1935–36. In the latter post he was among the leaders of the military coup of 10 October 1935 that overthrew the Second Hellenic Republic and restored the Greek monarchy.

== Career ==
Dimitrios Oikonomou was born in Chalcis on 4 June 1883, the son of Alexandros Oikonomou. He entered the Hellenic Navy Academy on 10 September 1899 and graduated as a Line Ensign on 15 July 1903. As a young officer he took part in the Goudi pronunciamiento in August 1909, as well as in the abortive revolt of Lt. Konstantinos Typaldos-Alfonsatos in October of the same year.

Promoted to Sub-Lieutenant on 29 March 1910, he fought in the First Balkan War of 1912–13 on board the battleship Psara, participating in the battles of Elli and Lemnos and the liberation of various Aegean islands. He was further promoted to Lieutenant on 2 June 1913, a few days before the outbreak of the Second Balkan War against Bulgaria, in which he fought on land with the 29th Naval Landing Detachment. On 16 July 1913 he was promoted to Lieutenant First Class.

In 1914 he finished a course in the Naval Gunnery School. During World War I he sided with King Constantine I in his dispute with Prime Minister Eleftherios Venizelos. A Lt. Commander since 3 March 1917, he was dismissed from the service on 21 June 1917, after Venizelos prevailed and took the country into the war on the side of the Entente. Following the electoral victory of the anti-Venizelist royalist parties, he was recalled to active service on 6 November 1920; his dismissal was revoked and he was quickly promoted to commander on 2 December. After participating briefly in the naval operations of the Asia Minor Campaign on board the destroyer Aetos, he assumed the post of commander of the Palaio Faliro naval airfield.

He then commanded the destroyer Panthir (1923) and the light cruiser Elli (1923–25). In June 1924, as captain of the Elli, he participated in the so-called "Navy Strike". Promoted to captain on 12 October 1925, he again assumed command of the Elli in 1926–27, before commanding the training ship Aris (1927–28) and the battleships Kilkis and Limnos in 1929. In 1929–30 he served as Superior Submarine Commander, a position where he distinguished himself by the drastic overhaul and modernization of crew training. In 1931 he served briefly as Commander of the Destroyer Flotilla, and subsequently, until 1934, as Chief of the Training Squadron. Promoted to rear admiral on 21 February 1934, and on 3 March 1935 he was appointed Chief of the Hellenic Navy General Staff, as well as Director-General in the Ministry of Naval Affairs. In May he was president of the Extraordinary Naval Court-Martial that tried the naval officers who had participated in the failed pro-Venizelist March coup attempt. He nevertheless immediately requested, with success, that the death sentences passed out not be carried out. On 10 October, along with the heads of the Army, Lt. General Alexandros Papagos, and the Air Force, Air Vice Marshal Georgios Reppas, he toppled the Second Hellenic Republic, restored the Greek monarchy, and installed Georgios Kondylis as Prime Minister and Regent pending the return of the exiled King George II.

On 21 February 1936, he was promoted to vice admiral. He remained in the post of Chief of the Navy General Staff until 19 December, when he was transferred to the post of Inspector-General of the Navy. In 1938–39 he held in tandem the position of Chief of Fleet Command. Oikonomou remained Inspector-General at the outbreak of the Greco-Italian War on 28 October 1940. For the duration of the war, until the Greek capitulation following the German invasion of Greece in April 1941, he remained in the post and held in parallel the positions of Chief of the Torpedo Boat Flotilla, Air Defence Chief and Director of the Air–Sea Alarm Service, as well as commander of the Naval Regions 1 and 3. Finally, on 25 April 1941, as the bulk of the Fleet and the government had left for the Middle East, Oikonomou was authorized to represent the Minister for Naval Affairs and command what remained of the navy until the final capitulation two days later. Oikonomou remained in Greece during the Occupation, and served in the Directorate-General of the Navy in the Ministry of National Defence of the collaborationist government in 1941–43.

After liberation, on 31 August 1946 he was decorated with the War Cross First Class and the Distinguished Actions Medal for his role in the 1940–41 conflict. He retired on 25 April 1947 and died at Syros on 11 September 1957.

== Other activities ==
In 1935, Oikonomou was a member of the Hellenic Olympic Committee, and from 1940 until 1944 he was chairman of the Yacht Club of Greece. After his retirement, in 1953–57 he was chairman of the board of the Greek Sea Union, and of the Hellenic Maritime Museum.

Oikonomou also published a number of historical works, including the archive of the Greek War of Independence hero, general Kostas Botsaris (1934), a study on the Suliots and the Botsaris family (Το Σούλι, οι Σουλιώτες και η Οικογένεια Μπότσαρη, 1954), as well as studies on the war record of the Navy during World War II (Πεπραγμένα του Β.Ν., 1947), and on Prince George of Greece and Denmark and the Greek naval programme (Η Α.Β.Υ. ο Πρίγκηψ Γεώργιος και το Ναυτικόν Πρόγραμμα της Χώρας, 1952).

Military offices
Preceded by Rear Admiral Periklis Dimoulis	Chief of the Hellenic Navy General Staff; 3 March 1935 – 19 December 1936	Succeeded by Captain Epameinondas Kavvadias
