= Georgios Panas =

Greek Navy officer

- Born: 1 January 1876; Kranio, Cephalonia
- Died: 6 August 1939; Athens
- Military career
- Allegiance: Kingdom of Greece (1894–1920, 1922–24); Second Hellenic Republic (1924–34)
- Branch: Hellenic Navy
- Service years: 1894–1920, 1922–34
- Rank: Vice Admiral
- Wars: Greco-Turkish War of 1897, Balkan Wars, World War I, Asia Minor Campaign

Georgios Panas (Greek: Γεώργιος Πανάς; Kranio, Cephalonia, 1 January 1876 – Athens, 6 August 1939) was a senior Greek Navy officer who fought in the Balkan Wars of 1912–1913, World War I, and the Asia Minor Campaign, and served as Chief of the Hellenic Navy General Staff in 1928–31, and briefly minister in the Alexandros Othonaios emergency government in March 1933.

== Life ==
Georgios Panas was born in the village of Kranio on the island of Cephalonia, on 1 January 1876. He entered the Navy Academy on 8 September 1890 (serial number 84), and graduated on 19 July 1894 as a Line Ensign. He participated in the Greco-Turkish War of 1897 on board the ironclad Spetsai. He was promoted to sub-lieutenant on 30 June 1899, lieutenant on 29 March 1910, and lieutenant first class on 29 March 1910. During this period, he also graduated from the Torpedo School.

In the Balkan Wars of 1912–13 he was executive officer on the torpedo boat Aspis, with which he participated in the capture of Lesbos (November 1912), the Battle of Lemnos (5 January 1913) and the operations of the Ionian Squadron (February 1913). He was then posted as commander of the destroyer Sfaktiria. After the Balkan Wars, he was promoted to Lt. Commander (28 September 1913), and Commander (13 April 1915). Following the establishment of the Provisional Government of National Defence, he left his post and joined the new government at Thessaloniki on 1 October 1916. He was appointed captain of the ironclad Hydra and commander of the provisional government's naval academy, which was established on board the vessel. At the same time he served as chief of staff to the Thessaloniki Squadron commander. Following the return to Athens of Eleftherios Venizelos and his assumption of government of the entirety of the country in June 1917, Panas became captain of the light cruiser Elli, being promoted to captain on 26 December 1917. He remained captain of the Elli through World War I and until 1919, when he was appointed Director of the Hellenic Naval Air Service.

He served in the early stages of the Asia Minor Campaign as captain of the battleship Limnos (1919–20), and was appointed naval attaché at the Greek embassy in London. He was discharged from the navy on 7 November 1920, following the electoral victory of the anti-Venizelist royalist parties. After the Greek defeat in the Asia Minor Campaign and the outbreak of the 11 September 1922 Revolution, on 7 October 1922 he was reinstated in active service, resuming his post as naval attaché in London until 1925. He then returned to take over command of the Navy Academy (1925–26). He then briefly held the post of Naval Training Supervisor, before becoming General Director of the Salamis Naval Base (1926–27). On 3 September 1926, he was promoted to rear admiral.

In 1927 Panas served as member of the council charged with revising the navy seniority list. In 1928, he was appointed Chief of the Fleet Command, before becoming Chief of the Hellenic Navy General Staff (1928–31), Inspector-General of the Navy (1931–32) and once more General Director of Salamis Naval Base in 1932–33. During this time, he also participated as an author and member of the editorial committee of the Great Military and Naval Encyclopaedia.

In March 1933 he was a member of the emergency military government under Lt. General Alexandros Othonaios, that assumed power to counter the abortive coup attempt led by Nikolaos Plastiras. Panas held the posts of Minister for State Health (7–10 March) and pro tempore Minister for Naval Affairs (9–10 March). He went on voluntary retirement on 15 January 1934, with the rank of vice admiral.

In retirement, he was a founding member of the Yacht Club of Greece (1934), and served as a member of its board of directors until his death on 6 August 1939. His son, Epameinondas, also became a naval officer.

Political offices
Preceded by Periklis Dimoulis	Minister of State Health; 7–10 March 1933	Succeeded by Christos Louis
Preceded by Ioannis Demestichas	Minister for Naval Affairs (pro tempore); 9–10 March 1933	Succeeded by Alexandros Hatzikyriakos
Military offices
Preceded by Rear Admiral Konstantinos Malikopoulos	Chief of the Hellenic Navy General Staff; 7 December 1928 – 18 February 1931	Succeeded by Captain Christos Louis
