= Ioannis Demestichas =

Greek Navy officer

- Ιωάννης Δεμέστιχας
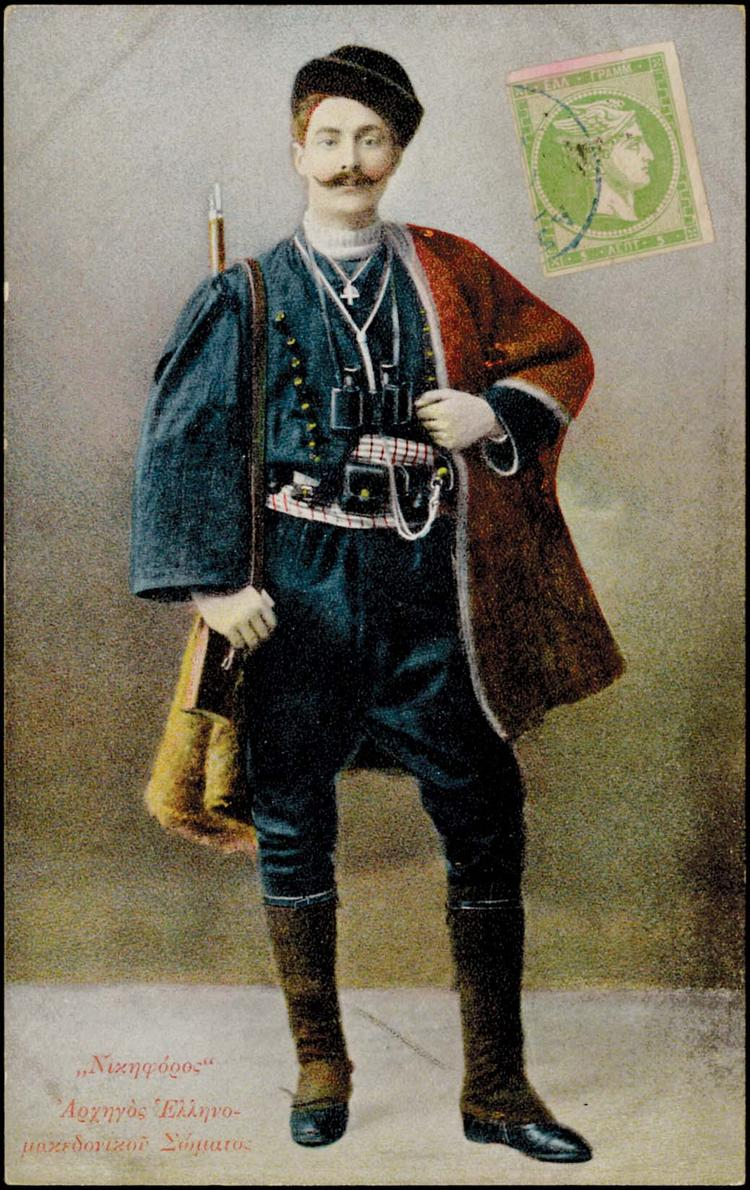
- Demestichas c. 1908–1909

Minister of Education
- In office 14 – 26 April 1944
- Monarch: George II
- Prime Minister: Sofoklis Venizelos
- Preceded by: Emmanouil Tsouderos
- Succeeded by: Sh. Sgouritsas

Minister of the Interior
- In office 14 – 26 April 1944
- Monarch: George II
- Prime Minister: Sofoklis Venizelos
- Preceded by: Emmanouil Tsouderos
- Succeeded by: A. Lambrinidis

Deputy Minister of the Mercantile Marine
- In office 14 – 26 April 1944
- Monarch: George II
- Prime Minister: Sofoklis Venizelos
- Preceded by: S. Theofanidis
- Succeeded by: Gerasimos Vasileiadis

Minister of Naval Affairs
- In office 6 – 9 March 1933
- President: Alexandros Zaimis
- Prime Minister: Alexandros Othonaios
- Preceded by: Iosif Koundouros
- Succeeded by: Georgios Panas

Minister of Aviation
- In office 6 – 9 March 1933
- President: Alexandros Zaimis
- Prime Minister: Alexandros Othonaios
- Preceded by: Iosif Koundouros
- Succeeded by: Alexandros Mazarakis-Ainian

Personal details
- Born: 30 November 1882 Athens, Kingdom of Greece
- Died: 7 December 1960 Marousi, Athens, Kingdom of Greece
- Nickname(s): Kapetan Nikiforos; Καπετάν Νικηφόρος

Military service
- Allegiance: Kingdom of Greece; Second Hellenic Republic
- Branch/service: Royal Hellenic Navy
- Years of service: 1900–1921; 1922–1924; 1924–1934; 1943–1945; 1946–1947
- Rank: Vice Admiral
- Commands: Aigli; Aspis; Niki; Nea Genea; Kilkis; Limnos; Military Governor of Tenedos; Military Governor of Samos; Chief of Hellenic Navy General Staff; Chief of the Fleet Command; Director-General of the Salamis Naval Base
- Battles/wars: Macedonian Struggle; Balkan Wars; First Balkan War; Battle of Chios (WIA); World War I; Macedonian front; Greco-Turkish War (1919-1922) World War II; Greco-Italian War; Battle of Greece
- Awards: War Cross

Ioannis Demestichas (Greek: Ιωάννης Δεμέστιχας; 1882–1960) was a Hellenic Navy officer. He is best known for his participation in the Macedonian Struggle under the nom de guerre of Kapetan Nikiforos (Καπετάν Νικηφόρος). He held various senior commands in the Greek Navy, including thrice as Chief of the Hellenic Navy General Staff, and also served briefly in cabinet positions.

== Life ==
=== Early career: Macedonian Struggle, the Balkan Wars and aftermath ===
Ioannis Demestichas was born in Athens on 30 November 1882. He entered the Hellenic Navy Academy on 1 September 1896, and graduated on 28 July 1900 as a Line Ensign. On 6 May 1905 he was promoted to Sub-Lieutenant. He participated in the 1906 Intercalated Games in the 400-metre course. He participated in the Macedonian Struggle in 1906–1907 under the nom de guerre of Kapetan Nikiforos, leading an armed band in the Giannitsa Lake area.

In August 1909 he participated in the successful Goudi coup, and later was among the ringleaders in the abortive coup of the more radical young officers, led by Lieutenant Konstantinos Typaldos-Alfonsatos, in October of the same year. Promoted to Lieutenant on 29 March 1910, he spent the years 1910–1912 in training abroad. With the outbreak of the First Balkan War in October 1912, he was given command of a gunboat, with which he participated in the operations in the Ambracian Gulf, but in early November he was detached to the Aegean fleet as commander of a landing detachment, with which he fought in the battles for the capture of the islands of the eastern Aegean. He was wounded during the liberation of Chios, and was later appointed military governor of Tenedos. On 1 January 1913 he was promoted to Lieutenant I Class.

After the Balkan Wars, he served as captain of the torpedo boat Aigli (1914–1915), being promoted to Lt. Commander on 20 October 1914. He then became captain of the destroyer Aspis (1915–1917), as well as instructor of naval calculus in the Naval Academy (1916–1917). On 9 May 1917, he left his post to join the Provisional Government of National Defence under Eleftherios Venizelos. Following Venizelos' return to Athens and his assumption of the government in June, Demestichas was made captain of the destroyers Niki (1917–1918) and Nea Genea (1918–1919), with which he participated in the anti-U-boat operations in the eastern Mediterranean. On 26 December 1917, he was promoted to commander.

=== Interwar period ===
In 1919–1920, he took part in the naval operations of the Asia Minor Campaign as commander of the destroyer Leon, but was placed on suspended duty on 27 April 1921, after the electoral victory of the anti-Venizelos royalist parties. Following the Greek retreat from Asia Minor and the 11 September 1922 Revolution, in which he took active part in Athens, he was recalled to active service as captain of the battleship Kilkis, and then as military commander of Samos island (1922–1923). On 20 December 1923 he was promoted to captain. He then assumed command of the Exercise Squadron in 1923–1924, and became commandant of the Navy Academy (1924). During the so-called "Navy strike" in June 1924, he voluntarily retired, but this was revoked on 21 August.

In 1926 he was captain of the battleship Limnos and Director-General of the Ministry of Naval Affairs, then Chief of the Hellenic Navy General Staff in 1926–1927, Higher Submarine Commander (1927–1928), again Director-General of the Ministry of Naval Affairs (1928–1929), Chief of the Fleet Command (1929–1931), Director-General of the Salamis Naval Base (1931–1932), and again as Chief of the Navy General Staff in 1932–1933. On 6 March 1933, he became a member of the emergency military government under Alexandros Othonaios, that assumed power to counter the abortive coup attempt led by Nikolaos Plastiras. He held the posts of Minister for Naval Affairs and for Aviation (6–9 March). After the failure of the coup, on 11 March he was placed on suspended duty due to his involvement in it, placed on indefinite leave on 12 September, and retired on 5 February 1934 with the rank of rear admiral in retirement. In 1934 he was one of the founding members of the Yacht Club of Greece.

Demestichas took part in Plastiras' second failed coup attempt in March 1935, and after its failure managed to escape to Naples in Italy. In Greece, he was tried and sentenced in absentia to death and loss of rank, but on 13 June 1936 he was pardoned and restored to his rank.

=== World War II and aftermath ===
In April 1943, he fled the Axis occupation of Greece and arrived in the Middle East, where on 17 April he joined the forces of the Greek government in exile. Recalled to active duty, he served as Inspector-General of the Navy (1943–45), and was successively promoted to rear admiral (17 September 1943) and Vice Admiral (2 November 1943). In April 1944, he served as Minister for the Interior, for Education, and as Deputy Minister for Mercantile Marine in the short-lived (14–26 April) exile cabinet of Sofoklis Venizelos.

He retired once more on 24 August 1945 as vice admiral in retirement, but was recalled between 30 August 1946 and 1 July 1947 to serve as a member of the commission on the selection of personnel for the reduced peacetime navy. On 21 January 1948 he was awarded the War Cross for his role in World War II.

He died at Marousi on 7 December 1960.

== Commemoration ==
Busts of Demestichas have been erected at Giannitsa and his family's home village of Kotronas. He is also a major character in Penelope Delta's 1937 historical novel The Secrets of the Swamp (Τα μυστικά του βάλτου), dealing with the Macedonian Struggle in the Giannitsa area.

Political offices
Preceded by Iosif Koundouros	Minister of Aviation; 6–9 March 1933	Succeeded by Alexandros Mazarakis-Ainian
Preceded by Iosif Koundouros	Minister of Naval Affairs; 6–9 March 1933	Succeeded by Georgios Panas
Preceded by Emmanouil Tsouderos	Minister of the Interior; 14–26 April 1944	Vacant Title next held by A. Lambrinidis as Acting Minister
Preceded by Emmanouil Tsouderos	Minister of Education; 14–26 April 1944	Vacant Title next held by Ch. Sgouritsas
Preceded by S. Theofanidis	Deputy Minister of Mercantile Marine; 14–26 April 1944	Vacant Title next held by Gerasimos Vasileiadis as Minister of Mercantile Marine
Military offices
Preceded by Captain Christos Louis	Chief of the Navy General Staff; 7 July – 3 October 1926	Succeeded by Captain Christos Louis
Preceded by Captain Christos Louis	Chief of the Navy General Staff; 1 December 1926 – 17 February 1927	Succeeded by Rear Admiral Konstantinos Typaldos-Alfonsatos
Preceded by Rear Admiral Periklis Dimoulis	Chief of the Navy General Staff; 10 December 1932 – 6 March 1933	Succeeded by Captain Christos Louis
