= Konstantinos Engolfopoulos =

- Born: 1912; Molos, Phthiotis
- Died: 6 May 1991 (aged 78–79); Athens
- Military career
- Allegiance: Second Hellenic Republic (1929–35); Kingdom of Greece (1935–67); Third Hellenic Republic (1975–76)
- Branch: Hellenic Navy
- Service years: 1929–67, 1975–76
- Rank: Vice Admiral
- Wars: World War II (Greco-Italian War and Battle of Greece, Battle of the Mediterranean), Greek Civil War
- Awards: War Cross (thrice)

Konstantinos Engolfopoulos (Greek: Κωνσταντίνος Εγκολφόπουλος, 1912–1991) was a Greek Hellenic Navy officer who served twice as Chief of the Hellenic Navy General Staff (1967 and 1975–76), retiring with the rank of vice admiral. He is notable for his opposition to the Greek military junta of 1967–74, which imprisoned him. He also served briefly as Minister for Mercantile Marine in 1974.

== Life ==
Born at the village of Molos, Phthiotis, in 1912, Konstantinos Engolfopoulos entered the Hellenic Navy Academy on 13 September 1929 and graduated on 28 September 1933 as a Line Ensign. During the failed pro-republican coup d'état attempt in March 1935 he was serving on the destroyer Psara. Accused of being involved in the coup, he was imprisoned on 19 March, but the court-martial acquitted him on 11 May and he resumed his service. He was then promoted to Sub-Lieutenant on 27 October 1937.

In 1940 he underwent training as on submarine warfare, and during the Greco-Italian War (1940–41) he served aboard submarines, undertaking patrols to intercept Italian shipping in the Adriatic Sea. On 31 December 1940 he was promoted to lieutenant. In March 1941 he received the War Cross for his service as an officer on board the submarine Nirefs. In April 1941, as the German invasion of Greece had almost overrun the country, as much of the Greek fleet as could be saved was sent to the Allied-held Middle East. Although only a subaltern, Engolfopoulos took over command of Nirefs and led his vessel to the Middle East, where he joined the forces of the Greek government-in-exile. For this initiative he received his second War Cross on 14 September 1944. He then served as executive officer on board the destroyer Pindos, with which he participated in the Battle of the Mediterranean as well as the Allied invasion of Sicily (July 1943) and the invasion of southern France (Operation Dragoon, August 1944). He assumed himself command of the destroyer Niki for a time in 1944. During the pro-Communist navy mutiny of April 1944, he participated in the boarding detachments that forcibly retook control of the ships and suppressed the mutiny.

Promoted to Lt. Commander on 1 January 1945, he assumed command of the destroyer Ierax (1945), of the tank carrier Samos (1945–46), of the open sea minesweeper Armatolos (1947–48), and of the destroyers Miaoulis (1948), Kriti (1948–49), Aigaion (1949–50), Kriti again (1950–51), and Navarinon (1951–52). At the same time, in 1948–50 he served as chief of staff of the Superior Commander of Light Craft, and was promoted to commander on 7 May 1949. On 16 January 1952 he was awarded his third War Cross for his service during the naval operations of the Greek Civil War (1946–49). Engolfopoulos then served as a staff officer at NATO's Supreme Headquarters Allied Powers Europe (1952–54). Promoted to captain on 8 January 1954, he served as director of the Hellenic Navy General Staff's A1 Bureau and underwent training at the Naval War School (1954–55), then served as captain of the Greek flagship, the cruiser Elli, as well as chief of staff to the Fleet Command (1955–56), and commanded the Kanellopoulos naval training centre (1956–58). After further studies at the National Defence School and then in the US (1958–59), he assumed command of the Naval War School (1959) and of the Second Light Craft Flotilla (1960–61), before his first senior staff appointments as Superior Commander of the Crete Naval Station (1961–62) and another stint at NATO CINCAFMED (1962–64).

Returning to Greece, he was appointed Chief of the Navy General Staff's Second Section (Organization) and was promoted to rear admiral on 23 April 1964 (retroactive to 8 February). He then served as director of the 3rd Joint Staff Group of the Hellenic National Defence General Staff (1964–65) and Chief of the Cretan and Ionian Seas Command (1965–67). After a brief stint as Deputy Chief of the Navy General Staff, he was promoted to vice admiral on 27 March 1967 and became Chief of the Navy General Staff and NATO COMEDEAST on 30 March. He held the post during the coup d'état of 21 April 1967 which established the military junta, but refused to support it and was dismissed on 24 April. Due to his known opposition to the regime, he was offered the leadership of the long-planned mutiny by the mostly anti-junta oriented navy, but he refused, as he did not believe it stood any chance of success. Indeed, the conspiracy was betrayed and the uprising in May 1973 failed; only the destroyer Velos managed to escape and its officers, led by captain Nikolaos Pappas, sought political asylum in Italy. Engolfopoulos was arrested by the junta, but was eventually released on 24 July without charges.

Following the collapse of the junta and the restoration of democracy in July/August 1974, he served as Minister for Mercantile Marine in the national unity government of Konstantinos Karamanlis from 6 October to 21 November 1974. On 8 January 1975, he was reinstated to active service "as having never left it", and resumed his post as Chief of the Navy until his retirement, upon his own request, on 8 January 1976. Engolfopoulos was also a witness at the trial of the junta leadership.

In 1981–82 he served as chairman of the Hellenic Sea Union. He died at Athens on 6 May 1991.

Political offices
Preceded by Ioannis Minaios	Minister for Mercantile Marine of Greece; 6 October – 21 November 1974	Succeeded by Alexandros Papadongonas
Military offices
Preceded by Vice Admiral Spyridon Avgeris	Chief of the Navy General Staff; 30 March – 24 April 1967	Succeeded by Rear Admiral Ippokratis Dedes
Preceded by Vice Admiral Petros Arapakis	Chief of the Navy Command; 8 January 1975 – 8 January 1976	Succeeded by Vice Admiral Spyridon Mourikis
