= Periklis Dimoulis =

Greek admiral

- Born: 2 September 1880; Athens, Greece
- Died: 30 October 1945 (aged 65); Athens, Greece
- Military career
- Allegiance: Kingdom of Greece (1896–24); Second Hellenic Republic (1924–35)
- Branch: Hellenic Navy
- Service years: 1896–1935
- Rank: Vice Admiral
- Conflicts: Balkan Wars, Allied intervention in Ukraine, Asia Minor Campaign

Periklis Dimoulis (Greek: Περικλής Δημούλης; 2 September 1880 – 30 October 1945) was a Hellenic Navy admiral who served thrice as Chief of the Hellenic Navy General Staff.

== Career ==
Periklis Dimoulis was born in Athens on 2 September 1880, the son of Dimitrios Dimoulis. He entered the Hellenic Navy Academy on 1 October 1896 and graduated as a Line Ensign on 29 July 1900. Promoted to Sub-Lieutenant on 6 May 1905, he took part in the Goudi pronunciamiento in August 1909, as well as in the abortive revolt of Lt. Konstantinos Typaldos-Alfonsatos in October of the same year.

In 1910–12 he trained abroad, and returned to participate in the Balkan Wars of 1912–13, where he served as executive officer of the destroyer Keravnos. He took part in the operations for the capture of Lesbos and Chios, as well as the blockade of the Ottoman cruiser Hamidiye in the Red Sea in April–May 1913. Promoted to Lieutenant on 23 May 1913 and Lieutenant First Class on 13 June, Dimoulis then took up a post as professor of advanced mathematics at the Navy Academy.

A Lt. Commander since 20 October 1914, his pro-royalist sympathies earned him a month-long suspension on 24 July 1917, after Eleftherios Venizelos took power, but unlike many royalist officers he was not dismissed, being promoted to commander on 9 January 1918 (retroactive to 11 May 1917). In 1919–20 he was captain of the destroyer Ierax, with which he participated in the Allied intervention in Ukraine and the initial stages of the Asia Minor Campaign, before returning to the Navy Academy as professor of electrics. Following the electoral victory of the anti-Venizelist royalist parties in November 1920, his suspension was annulled, and he was promoted to captain on 19 December (retroactive to 25 June). He remained in the Navy Academy until 1922, when he was appointed captain of the battleship Limnos, taking part in the final stages of the Asia Minor Campaign.

He then served as Chief of the Fleet Command (1923) and captain of the hospital ship Konstantinoupolis (1924). During the so-called "Navy Strike" in June 1924 he submitted his resignation, retiring as Rear Admiral in retirement, but was quickly recalled to active service. He served as Naval Training Supervisor in 1925 and 1926, Chief of the Submarine Service (1926), Director-General of the Salamis Naval Base in 1929–30, and Superior Submarine Commander in 1930–31. On 7 December 1931 he was appointed Chief of the Hellenic Navy General Staff, a post he held until 10 December 1932, being promoted to rear admiral (22 January 1932) in the meantime. He then became Inspector-General of the Navy until the aftermath of the pro-Venizelist 6 March coup attempt by Nikolaos Plastiras. In the emergency cabinet under Lt. General Alexandros Othonaios, he held for a single day (6 March) the post of Minister of State Health and Awareness. On 9 March he was reappointed as Chief of the Navy General Staff until 17 August. On 25 August he was placed on a four-month suspended duty due to his involvement in the Plastiras coup. He returned to the post of Chief of the Navy General Staff on 17 July 1934, holding the post until another pro-Venizelist coup attempt on 1 March 1935. He was again placed in suspension on 21 March, and dismissed from the service on 30 July, but reinstated on 10 January 1936 and regarded as on retirement with the rank of vice admiral in retirement.

Admiral Dimoulis died at Athens on 30 October 1945.

Political offices
Preceded by Konstantinos Gotsis	Minister of State Health and Awareness; 6–7 March 1933	Succeeded by Georgios Panas
Military offices
Preceded by Captain Christos Louis	Chief of the Hellenic Navy General Staff; 7 December 1931 – 10 December 1932	Succeeded by Captain Ioannis Demestichas
Preceded by Captain Christos Louis	Chief of the Hellenic Navy General Staff; 9 March 1933 – 17 August 1933	Succeeded by Captain Epameinondas Kavvadias
Preceded by Captain Epameinondas Kavvadias	Chief of the Hellenic Navy General Staff; 17 July 1934 – 3 March 1935	Succeeded by Rear Admiral Dimitrios Oikonomou
