= Alexandros Sakellariou =

Greek admiral and politician

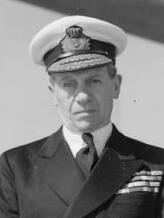
- Alexandros Sakellariou (on the left) on board the cruiser Averof, Port Said 1943
- Born: 1 January 1887; Mandra, Elefsis, Greece
- Died: 7 July 1982 (aged 95); Athens, Greece
- Military career
- Allegiance: Kingdom of Greece (1906–1917, 1920–1923); Second Hellenic Republic (1925–1935); Kingdom of Greece (1935–1944)
- Branch: Hellenic Navy
- Rank: Vice Admiral
- Wars: Balkan Wars, Asia Minor Campaign, World War II
- Awards: Commander's Cross of the Cross of Valour

Alexandros Pilatos Sakellariou (Greek: Αλέξανδρος Πιλάτος Σακελλαρίου; Mandra, 1 January 1887 – Athens, 7 July 1982 ) was a Greek admiral and politician, who led the Royal Hellenic Navy in World War II.

== Life ==
=== Early career ===
Born in the village of Mandra near Elefsina on 1 January 1887, Sakellariou entered the Hellenic Naval Academy on 4 November 1902 and graduated on 8 July 1906 as a Line Ensign. He participated in the Goudi coup in August 1909, and was promoted to Sub-Lieutenant on 29 March 1910, and Lieutenant II Class on 2 July 1913.

During the Balkan Wars of 1912–13 he served on board the Greek flagship, the cruiser Georgios Averof. With Georgios Averof, he fought in the Battle of Elli and the Battle of Lemnos, as well as participating in the capture of Lemnos, Imbros, Samothrace, Tenedos, Mount Athos, Lesbos, Kavala and Dedeagatch. Following the Balkan Wars, he was promoted on 2 November 1914 to Lieutenant I Class (retroactive to 17 October). As a staunch royalist, he was dismissed from the Navy on 21 June 1917, following the exile of King Constantine I and the assumption of government in Athens by Eleftherios Venizelos. He was brought before a court-martial and condemned to three years imprisonment at the Izzeddin Fortress in Souda.

On 10 November 1920, following the electoral victory of the anti-Venizelist royalist parties, he was recalled to active service; his dismissal was revoked and his sentence was stricken. Sakellariou was promoted to Lieutenant Commander on 2 December 1920, retroactively dated to 21 December 1917, and on the very same day promoted further to Commander, also retroactively to 26 June 1920. With his new rank, he participated in the naval operations of the Greco-Turkish War of 1919–22 as captain of the destroyers Lonchi (1920–21), Ierax (1921), and Niki (1922). Following the Greek defeat in the war and the 11 September 1922 Revolution, he was dismissed from the service on 12 September 1923 with the rank of Captain in retirement. As the abortive royalist Leonardopoulos-Gargalidis coup attempt followed soon after, he was briefly arrested and interrogated, but released after a few days. On 25 February 1925, he received the Cross of Valour in Gold for his service during the Greco-Turkish War.

=== Interwar period and World War II ===
Like many other royalist officers, Sakellariou was reinstated by the dictatorship of Theodoros Pangalos, on 24 July 1925, with his former active rank of Commander. He served as captain of the auxiliary vessel Amfitriti in 1925, and of the destroyer Aetos in 1926, going on to hold the posts of Commander of the Thessaloniki Naval Defence Area (1926–27), the Naval War School (1928–29), and captain of the Navy training vessel Aris in 1930.

Promoted to captain on 22 October 1932, he served as General Director of the Salamis Naval Base, and Commander of the Destroyers Flotilla (1932–35). Promoted to rear admiral on 23 March 1935, he was chairman of the extraordinary court-martial that tried the politicians who had participated in the Venizelist coup attempt in March. In 1935–36 he was Chief of the Light Fleet. From this post he played a key role in the bloodless coup of Georgios Kondylis on 10 October 1935, which quickly abolished the Second Hellenic Republic and restored the monarchy.

He became Chief of the Navy General Staff in January 1937, serving in the post (with a brief interruption in August–September 1938) until the aftermath of the German invasion of Greece in April 1941. In the chaos of the German invasion, and following the suicide of Prime Minister Alexandros Koryzis on 18 April, King George II named Sakellariou as Minister for Naval Affairs and Deputy Prime Minister (with Emmanouil Tsouderos assuming office as Prime Minister on 20 April). In the face of the German advance and the heavy losses suffered by the surface vessels to the Luftwaffe, Sakellariou ordered the remaining ships to evacuate Greece towards British-held Egypt, where the Greek king and his government arrived later to form a government in exile, which was based in Cairo until Liberation in 1944.

Sakellariou followed the government to Crete and thence, on board HMS Auckland, to Alexandria. He resigned his government posts on 2 May 1942, but remained as the head of the exiled fleet until his retirement on 26 December 1943, with the rank of vice admiral in retirement.

=== Post-war career ===
After Liberation, in the 1946 elections he successfully stood for election in Parliament in the Atticoboeotia prefecture at the head of his own party, the Panhellenic National Party (part of the United Alignment of Nationalists alliance). On 29 August 1947 he was named Minister of Supply and pro tempore Minister of Merchant Marine in the Konstantinos Tsaldaris cabinet. In the succeeding cabinet of Themistoklis Sofoulis, he was once again Minister for Naval Affairs (until 18 November 1948).

On 31 July 1946, he was awarded the War Cross First Class and the Outstanding Acts Medal for his role in World War II. On 4 September 1946, he was briefly recalled to active service, retroactively promoted to vice admiral from 31 December 1943, and with his retirement dated to 1 January 1944. On 1 July 1947, in further recognition of his role in leading the Greek navy during World War II, he was awarded the highest Greek decoration for valour, the Commander's Cross of the Cross of Valour.

In the 1950 elections he was once again elected to parliament for Atticoboeotia. Finally, in the 1951–52 Nikolaos Plastiras cabinet, Sakellariou was appointed Minister for National Defence, until his resignation on 31 March 1952. He died in Athens on 7 July 1982.

== Writings ==
As an active officer, Sakellariou wrote the Greek Navy's sailing manual in 1915, and a historical study on the use of artillery in the late Byzantine Empire (Ιστορία του Πυροβολικού κατά την Δύσιν της Μεσαιωνικής Ημών Αυτοκρατορίας, 1926). In 1945 he wrote the study Η Θέσις της Ελλάδος εις τον Δεύτερον Παγκόσμιον Πόλεμον on Greece's role during World War II. he later wrote a series of memoirs, beginning with Ταξιδεύοντας ("Voyaging", 1957), Απ’ τις Γέφυρες και τα Καρρέ ("From Bridges and Wardrooms", 1967), Ένας Ναύαρχος Θυμάται ("An Admiral Remembers") and Απομνημονεύματα ενός Ναυάρχου ("Memoirs of an Admiral").

== Sources ==
- Rear Adm. D. Giakoumakis. Αντιναύαρχος Αλεξ. Σακελαρίου (1887–1982) - Αντιναύαρχος Επαμ. Καββαδίας (1886–1965). Μαχητές του Χρέους και της Θυσίας (Βίοι παράλληλοι). Union of Retired Hellenic Navy Officers official website (in Greek). Archived from the original on 12 February 2005.

Political offices
Vacant Title last held by Konstantinos Zavitzianos	Deputy Prime Minister of Greece; 20 April 1941 – 2 May 1942	Succeeded by Panagiotis Kanellopoulos
Preceded by Ippokratis Papavasileiou	Minister for Naval Affairs of Greece; 20 April 1941 – 2 May 1942	Succeeded by Emmanouil Tsouderos as Minister for National Defence
Vacant Title last held by Panagiotis Kantzias	Minister for Supply of Greece; 19 August – 7 September 1947	Succeeded by Fokion Zaimis
Preceded by Sofoklis Venizelos	Minister for Mercantile Marine of Greece (pro tempore); 19 August – 7 September 1947	Succeeded by Theodoros Kizanis
Preceded by Petros Mavromichalis	Minister for Naval Affairs of Greece; 7 September 1947 – 18 November 1948	Succeeded by Petros Mavromichalis
Preceded by Panagiotis Spiliotopoulos	Minister for National Defence of Greece; 27 October 1951 – 28 March 1952	Succeeded by Sofoklis Venizelos
Military offices
Preceded by Captain Epameinondas Kavvadias	Chief of the Navy General Staff; 12 January 1937 – 13 August 1938	Succeeded by Rear Admiral Epameinondas Kavvadias
Preceded by Rear Admiral Epameinondas Kavvadias	Chief of the Navy General Staff; 17 September 1938 – 20 April 1941	Succeeded by Rear Admiral Charalambos Delagrammatikas
