= Leonidas Vasilikopoulos =

Greek naval and intelligence officer

- Born: 21 May 1932; Athens, Kingdom of Greece
- Died: 30 May 2014 (aged 82); Athens, Greece
- Military career
- Allegiance: Kingdom of Greece (1954–1966); Third Hellenic Republic (1975–1989)
- Branch: Hellenic Navy
- Service years: 1954–1966, 1975–1989
- Rank: Admiral
- Commands: Chief of the Hellenic Navy General Staff & COMEDEAST (1986–89)
- Other work: Director of the National Intelligence Service (1993–1996)

Leonidas Vasilikopoulos (Greek: Λεωνίδας Βασιλικόπουλος; 21 May 1932 – 30 May 2014) was a Greek Navy officer, who served as Chief of the Hellenic Navy General Staff in 1986–1989 and then as head of the Greek National Intelligence Service in 1993–1996. A distinguished officer, he is also notable for his participation in resistance groups against the Greek military junta of 1967–1974, being repeatedly imprisoned and exiled as a consequence.

== Life ==
Born in Athens on 21 May 1932, Leonidas Vasilikopoulos entered the Hellenic Navy Academy on 7 October 1949 and graduated on 18 June 1954 as a Line Ensign. Promoted to sub-lieutenant on 4 June 1957, he received his first command, the vehicle carrier Merlin, in 1961. On 16 October 1961, he was promoted to lieutenant. In 1962, he received command of the vehicle carriers Daniolos and Grigoropoulos (1962–63). On 19 August 1966, he voluntarily retired with the rank of lieutenant in retirement. The reason for his early retirement was his persistence in marrying Nota Iliopoulou, daughter of Stavros Iliopoulos, an MP of the United Democratic Left, successor of the banned Communist Party. Vasilikopoulos had repeatedly been trying to get the service's permission to marry her since October 1963, but in vain. He even brought the case to the Council of State, which found in his favour on 27 November 1965, but his insistence was received with disfavour in the Navy leadership: on 5 January 1966, he was informed that he would not be promoted, as his "feuding with the service" placed his "loyalty to the legitimate authorities" in doubt, and by March he received an unfavourable transfer and was restricted to unimportant duties.

During the Greek military junta of 1967–1974, he was an active opponent of the military regime, and was imprisoned and tortured by the Greek Military Police (EAT-ESA). Thus he was arrested by EAT-ESA on 2 August 1969 and held for a month in prison for his participation in the anti-junta Filiki Etaireia group. He was then placed in isolated custody in a hotel until 21 April 1970, and then sent to internal exile at Samothrace until 8 April 1971. Shortly after his release, on 23 September, he was re-arrested for his participation in another anti-junta group, Free Greeks, and held in the Korydallos Prison until 14 July 1972. He was re-arrested on 21 May 1973 for his participation in the Antidictatorial Youth-EAN group, and condemned to two and a half years in prison, but released in the general amnesty of 21 August.

On 5 April 1974, the junta removed Vasilikopoulos from the naval reserve list for anti-regime and "anti-national" acts. Following the re-establishment of democracy in August 1974, on 3 December this act was reversed, and on 24 February 1975 he was recalled to active service with his old rank of lieutenant. On 14 August 1976, he was declared as having never been removed from service, and was retroactively promoted to the ranks of lieutenant commander (dated 13 October 1966) and commander (29 June 1970). In 1975–76 he again commanded the Daniolos, followed by command of the destroyer Leon, studies at the Naval War School (1976), and command of the 3rd Destroyer Squadron (1977). On 21 June 1977, he was promoted to captain.

In 1977–78 Vasilikopoulos commanded the destroyer Velos. In 1979–80 he served as a staff officer in NATO's COMEDCENT. In 1980–81 he attended the NATO Defence School and the Greek National Defence Academy. In 1981–82 he served as head of Mine Warfare Command. He was then posted head of the Second Branch (Personnel) of the Hellenic Navy General Staff (1982–1984). He was promoted to Commodore on 17 March 1982 (retroactive to 5 January). On 20 December 1984, he was promoted to rear admiral, and was posted head of the Naval Training Command (1984–1986). Promoted to vice admiral on 20 January 1986, he assumed the Fleet Command, before being appointed Chief of the Navy General Staff on 22 December 1986. He held the post until his retirement on 17 July 1989, when he was given the final rank of full admiral in retirement. Concurrently, he was also head of NATO's COMEDEAST. The chief event of his tenure, was the Greco-Turkish crisis in March 1987, which he handled very successfully.

In October 1993, he was appointed as head of the National Intelligence Service by Prime Minister Andreas Papandreou, a post he held until dismissed following the Imia crisis with Turkey in early 1996. During the latter crisis, the Greek government's handling of the situation was hampered by the intense distrust shown by the newly appointed Prime Minister, Kostas Simitis, towards the incumbent military and intelligence chiefs, Vasilikopoulos among them.

Admiral Vasilikopoulos died on 30 May 2014.

Military offices
Preceded by Vice Admiral Nikolaos Pappas	Chief of the Navy General Staff; 22 December 1986 – 15 July 1989	Succeeded by Vice Admiral Evangelos Lagaras
Preceded by Air Marshal Panagiotis Bales	Director of the National Intelligence Service; 18 October 1993 – 24 April 1996	Succeeded by Air Marshal Charalambos Stavrakakis
