= Spyridon Avgeris =

Greek Navy officer

- Born: 10 September 1909; Salamis Island
- Died: 3 January 1972 (aged 62)
- Military career
- Allegiance: Second Hellenic Republic (1925–35); Kingdom of Greece (1935–67)
- Branch: Hellenic Navy
- Service years: 1925–67
- Rank: Vice Admiral
- Wars: World War II (Greco-Italian War and Battle of Greece, Battle of the Mediterranean), Greek Civil War
- Awards: War Cross (twice)

Spyridon Avgeris (Greek: Σπυρίδων Αυγέρης, 10/23 September 1909 – 3 January 1972) was a Greek Navy officer who served as Chief of the Hellenic Navy General Staff (1963–67) and of the Hellenic National Defence General Staff (1967), retiring with the rank of vice admiral.

== Life ==
Born on Salamis Island on 10 September 1909, Spyridon Avgeris entered the Hellenic Navy Academy on 9 October 1925 and graduated on 10 October 1929 as a Line Ensign. He was promoted to su-lieutenant on 13 October 1933, and lieutenant on 27 October 1937. He served aboard various warships, and specialized in naval artillery, attending the Gunnery School in 1937.

During the Greco-Italian War and the subsequent German invasion of Greece (1940–41) he served as commander of a naval anti-aircraft battery at Mount Aigaleo. Following the Axis occupation of Greece, he served in 1941–42 in the collaborationist government's Ministry of National Defence. In February 1942 he tried to escape to the Middle East and join the forces of the Greek government-in-exile, but he suffered a shipwreck on 18 February and managed only after many difficulties to reach his destination, joining the Greek Armed Forces in the Middle East on 15 May. For this he received the Medal for Outstanding Acts in 1951. He served in the staff of the Fleet Command, and took part in the Battle of the Mediterranean on board the destroyers Panthir and Kanaris, before becoming captain of the minesweeper Paralos. Promoted to lieutenant commander on 1 January 1943, he then assumed command of the Minesweeper Squadron and of the corvette Sachtouris. In July 1943, he participated in the Allied invasion of Sicily as executive officer of Kanaris, and for his actions during the capture of Augusta, received the War Cross. In 1944–45 he served as adjutant to the Minister of Naval Affairs (Panagiotis Kanellopoulos and then Nikolaos Plastiras). Following the liberation of Greece in October 1944, he served as captain of the corvette Tombazis and the destroyer Miaoulis, as well as again as adjutant to Kanellopoulos during the latter's brief tenure as Prime Minister in November 1945.

Avgeris was promoted to commander on 31 December 1945. In the next years he served as deputy commander of the Navy Academy, as well as captain of the destroyer Pindos, with which he distinguished himself during the repulsion of the attack on Leonidio by communist guerrillas in January 1949. For his service during the Greek Civil War, Avgeris was awarded his second War Cross on 16 January 1952. He then commanded, the minesweeper Armatolos, and the retired cruiser Georgios Averof in 1950. He graduated from the Naval War School in 1950, and became chief of staff of the Fleet Command in 1950–52, being promoted to captain on 5 December 1951. As Captain he took over command of the navy's largest vessel, the cruiser Elli (1952), before going on to serve as a naval attache at Rome (1953–55). He then attended the NBC Warfare School (1955), and took over as commander of the naval training centres Kanellopoulos (1955–56) and Palaskas (1956). In 1956–57 he served as Minesweeper Commander, then as Naval Commander Western Greece (1957), and again as Minesweeper Commander in tandem with the post of Commander of the Financial Police maritime squadron (1958). In 1959 e graduated from the US Navy's the Mine Warfare School. He also served as Superior Commander of the Crete Naval Station (1959), and chief of the Hellenic Navy General Staff's operations branch, doubling as chief of staff of NATO COMEDEAST, in 1959–60.

Promoted to rear admiral on 13 December 1960, he served as Chief of the Cretan and Ionian Seas Command (1960–61) and Deputy Chief of the Navy General Staff (1961–63). Promoted to vice admiral on 9 December 1963, he assumed the post of Chief of the Navy General Staff and chief of COMEDEAST until 30 March 1967, when he was appointed Chief of the Hellenic National Defence General Staff. He held the post during and after the coup d'état of 21 April 1967 which established the military junta, but was dismissed on 14 December 1967 following the failed counter-coup of King Constantine II the previous day.

He died on 3 January 1972.

Military offices
Preceded by Vice Admiral Dimitrios Kiosses	Chief of the Navy General Staff; 12 December 1963 – 30 March 1967	Succeeded by Vice Admiral Konstantinos Engolfopoulos
Preceded by Lt. General Konstantinos Tsolakas	Chief of the National Defence General Staff; 30 March – 14 December 1967	Succeeded by Lt. General Odysseas Angelis
