= Navy General Staff =

Navy General Staff may refer to:

- The Hellenic Navy General Staff, the naval component of the Greek Armed Forces, active from 1907 to 1941 and since 1944
- The Imperial Japanese Navy General Staff, the highest organ within the Imperial Japanese Navy, active from 1893 to 1945
