= Kavvadias =

Greek surname

Kavvadias (Greek: Καββαδίας) is a Greek surname. Notable people with this name include:

- Epameinondas Kavvadias (1886–1965), admiral of the Hellenic Navy
- Nikos Kavvadias (1910–1975), poet
- Panagiotis Kavvadias (1850–1928), archaeologist
  - Alexander Polycleitos Cawadias (1884–1971), physician and son of Panagiotis Kavvadias — generally used the spelling Cawadias in English.
