= Nikolaos Tsounis =

Greek naval officer

- Νικόλαος Τσούνης
- Born: Athens
- Military career
- Allegiance: Greece
- Branch: Hellenic Navy
- Service years: 1979–2020
- Rank: Admiral
- Commands: Chief of the Navy General Staff

Admiral Nikolaos Tsounis (Greek: Νικόλαος Τσούνης) is a Greek naval officer, and a former Chief of the Hellenic Navy General Staff.

== Biography ==
Nikolaos Tsounis was born in Athens, and entered the Hellenic Navy Academy in 1979, graduating in June 1983 as a line ensign.

He served as an officer aboard the destroyer Kanaris in 1983–84, and the fast attack boat Xenos in 1984–85. After commanding the patrol boat Panagopoulos I in 1985–86, he was promoted to second lieutenant on 28 June 1986. In 1988–1991 he served as operations and weapons officer on the fast attack boat Simitzopoulos, being promoted to lieutenant on 2 July 1990. He then served as captain of the patrol boat Antoniou (1991–92), and of the torpedo boats Kentavros (1992–93) and Esperos (1993–95). He was promoted to lieutenant commander on 30 June 1995, and commanded the fast attack boat Troupakis in 1995–1998.

In 1998 he transferred to the Fleet Headquarters staff as an assistant to the chief of the operations section. In 1999 he assumed command of the 2nd Fast Attack Craft Squadron (ΜΤΠΚ/2), which he led until 2001. He was promoted to commander on 9 June 2000. In 2001–2004 he served in the Hellenic Navy General Staff as section chief, as commander of the frigate Adrias in 2004–05, and then as ACOS N1 at STRIKFORNATO in 2005–2008. Promoted to captain on 4 March 2008, he served as coordinator of the permanent staff of the Hellenic National Defence General Staff's national operations centre in 2008–09, before switching to Fleet Headquarters staff as director of I Branch. In 2010–11 he headed the Fast Attack Boat Command, before returning to the staff of Fleet Headquarters as head of the Operational Evaluation Directorate, until 2012. Promoted to commodore on 1 April 2012, he served as chief of Fleet Headquarters staff in 2012–13, and as head of the Frigates Command in 2013–14.

Promoted to rear admiral on 10 March 2014, he served as chief of Fleet Headquarters in 2014–15, was promoted to vice admiral on 13 October 2015, director of the National Defence Academy on 20 October 2015, before being chosen as Chief of the Hellenic Navy General Staff on 16 January 2017. He remained in this post for three years, being replaced on 17 January 2020 by Vice Admiral Stylianos Petrakis.

== Family ==
Admiral Tsounis is married and has two children.

Military offices
Preceded by Vice Admiral Georgios Giakoumakis	Chief of the Hellenic Navy General Staff; 16 January 2017 – 17 January 2020	Succeeded by Vice Admiral Stylianos Petrakis
