= Epameinondas Kavvadias =

Greek admiral and politician (1886–1965)

- Επαμεινώνδας Καββαδίας
- Kavvadias photographed in uniform, c. 1940
- Born: January 1, 1886; Athens
- Died: April 10, 1965 (aged 78–79); Athens
- Relatives: Panagiotis Kavvadias (father); Alexander Polycleitos Cawadias (brother)
- Military career
- Allegiance: Kingdom of Greece, Second Hellenic Republic
- Service: Hellenic Navy
- Service years: 1902–1947
- Rank: Vice Admiral (Greek: αντιναύαρχος)
- Nickname: Paminos
- Commands: Nafkratousa (1913), Dafni (1914), Doris (1914–15), Niki (1920–22), Thyella (1922), Hephaestos (1928–29), Georgios Averof (1932–33), Hellenic Navy (1937 and 1938-39, 1939-41)
- Conflicts: German invasion of Greece
- Awards: Gold Cross of Valour, War Cross 1st Class, War Cross 2nd Class.

Epameinondas Kavvadias (Greek: Επαμεινώνδας Καββαδίας; 1 January 1886 – 10 April 1965) was a Greek admiral who served thrice as Chief of the Navy General Staff and led the Greek fleet in the first years of World War II.

== Life ==
Epameinondas Kavvadias was born in Athens in 1886 to a family hailing from Kefalonia. His father, Panagiotis Kavvadias, was an archaeologist who became Greece's Ephor General of Antiquities. Kavvadias entered the Hellenic Naval Academy in 1902 and graduated in 1906, and served in the Royal Hellenic Navy in the Balkan Wars as a sub-lieutenant in the destroyer Nafkratousa. During the Asia Minor Campaign, he commanded the destroyers Thyella and Niki. He was dismissed from the Navy in 1922, following the September 1922 Revolution, due to his royalist convictions, but reinstated by the Theodoros Pangalos dictatorship in 1925.

As Captain, he served his first tenure as Chief of the Navy General Staff in 1933–1934. In 1935 he was appointed to the post of Commander of the submarine fleet, and served again for a short period at the head of the Navy General Staff in December 1936 – January 1937. He subsequently served as Chief of the Royal Naval Base at Salamis until 1939, including another short term at the head of the General Staff in August–September 1938. Promoted to Rear Admiral in the meantime, in September 1939 he was appointed Chief of the Fleet Command. He led the operations of the Greek fleet during the Greco-Italian War of 1940–1941, and following the German invasion of Greece in April 1941, led the fleet to its exile in the British-held Middle East. He remained Chief of the Fleet until 2 May 1942, when he was appointed Vice Minister for Naval Affairs in the Greek government in exile, a post he held until 25 March 1943. In 1946, he was sent to London as naval attaché. In 1950, he published his war memoirs under the title The Naval War of 1940 as I Experienced It (Greek: "Ο ναυτικός πόλεμος του 1940 όπως τον έζησα").

He died in Athens on 10 April 1965.

== Honours ==
Among other Greek and foreign medals, Kavvadias received:

- Commander's Cross of the Cross of Valour (1 July 1947), Greece's highest military award, for his overall leadership of the fleet in World War II
- Medal for Outstanding Acts (31 August 1946), for his role in the reorganization of the fleet in exile
- War Cross 1st Class (31 August 1946), for the Greco-Italian War
- War Cross 2nd Class (14 September 1944), for the Navy's evacuation in April 1941
- War Cross 2nd Class (27 October 1941), for the Greco-Italian War
- Cross of Valour in Gold (25 February 1922), for the Asia Minor Campaign

He was also named honorary aide de camp to King Paul in 1947, and Honorary Chief of the Fleet in 1963.

== Sources ==
- Rear Adm. D. Giakoumakis. Αντιναύαρχος Αλεξ. Σακελλαρίου (1887-1982) - Αντιναύαρχος Επαμ. Καββαδίας (1886-1965). Μαχητές του Χρέους και της Θυσίας (Βίοι παράλληλοι). Union of Retired Hellenic Navy Officers official website (in Greek). Archived from the original on 12 February 2005.
- Hellenic Navy (2022-10-10). "Υποναύαρχος Επαμεινώνδας Καββαδίας ΠΝ" (in Greek). Archived from the original on 2023-02-11.

Military offices
Preceded by Rear Admiral Periklis Dimoulis	Chief of the Navy General Staff; 23 August 1933 – 17 July 1934	Succeeded by Rear Admiral Periklis Dimoulis
Preceded by Vice Admiral Dimitrios Oikonomou	Chief of the Navy General Staff; 19 December 1936 – 12 January 1937	Succeeded by Rear Admiral Alexandros Sakellariou
Preceded by Rear Admiral Alexandros Sakellariou	Chief of the Navy General Staff; 13 August – 17 September 1938	Succeeded by Rear Admiral Alexandros Sakellariou
