= Louis (surname) =

Louis is a French surname. Notable people with the surname include:

- Antoine Louis (1723–1792), French surgeon and physiologist
- Arthur Louis (1945–2014, born as Louis Arthur Bulgin), Jamaican-British musician
- Chris Louis (born 1969), English speedway rider
- Christos Louis (born 1948), Greek molecular geneticist
- Darrell Louis, American politician
- Édouard Louis (born 1992), French writer and sociologist
- Errol Louis (born 1962), American journalist and television show host
- Gaspard Louis, Haitian dancer and choreographer
- Godfrey Louis, solid-state physicist
- Jean Louis (1907–1997), French-born costume designer
- Jefferson Louis (born 1979), English footballer
- Jeremiah Louis (born 1996), Saint Kitts and Nevis cricketer and Mikyle Louis's brother
- Joe Louis (1914–1981), professional name of American boxer and heavyweight champion Joseph Louis Barrow
- Julia Louis-Dreyfus (born 1961), American actress, comedian, and producer
- Kyle Louis (born 2004), American football player
- Lance Louis (born 1985), American football player
- Laura Glen Louis, American author & poet
- Laurent Louis (born 1980), Belgian politician
- Léopold Louis-Dreyfus (1833–1915), French businessman, founder of the Louis Dreyfus Group, and patriarch of the Louis-Dreyfus family
- Lil Louis, stage name of American house-music producer and DJ Louis Sims
- Michèle Pierre-Louis (born 1947), Haitian politician * Mikyle Louis (born 2000), Saint Kitts and Nevis cricketer and Jeremiah Louis's brother
- Morris Louis (1912–1962), American painter
- Murray Louis (1926–2016), American modern dancer and choreographer
- Olin Pierre Louis, Haitian priest
- Peter Louis (born 1945), Australian rugby league footballer and coach
- Pierre Charles Alexandre Louis (1787–1872), French physician
- Richard Louis (1964–2025), Barbadian sprinter
- Séraphine Louis (1864–1942), French painter
- Spyridon Louis (1873–1940), Greek runner
- Thomas Louis (1758–1807), British naval officer
- Tim Louis (born 1958), Canadian lawyer and municipal politician
- Tim Louis, Canadian Member of Parliament
- Tristan Louis (born 1971), French-American author
- Wm. Roger Louis (born 1936), American historian

== See also ==
- Pierre Louÿs (1870–1925), French writer
- Lewis (surname)
