= Miltiadis Koimisis =

Greek Army officer

- Koimisis c. 1933
- Native name: Μιλτιάδης Κοιμήσης
- Born: 1878; Kravasaras, Kingdom of Greece
- Died: 24 April 1935 (aged 56/57); Athens, Kingdom of Greece
- Cause of death: Execution by firing squad
- Allegiance: Kingdom of Greece; Second Hellenic Republic
- Service / branch: Hellenic Army
- Rank: Major General
- Commands: 7th Infantry Division; Commandant of the Hellenic Military Academy
- Battles / wars: Balkan Wars, World War I, Greco-Turkish War of 1919-1922

Miltiadis Koimisis (Greek: Μιλτιάδης Κοιμήσης; 1878 – 24 April 1935) was a Hellenic Army officer who reached the rank of Major General.

Miltiadis Koimisis was born in 1878 at Kravasaras. He entered the NCO School, and graduated on 4 September 1904, being commissioned as an infantry second lieutenant. He participated in the Balkan Wars of 1912–13, and during World War I he commanded the training centre at Liosia.

During the Asia Minor Campaign he served as chief of staff of the 7th Infantry Division during the Battle of Sakarya in 1921, and during the Greek retreat following the Battle of Dumlupinar in August 1922, where the 7th Division was one of the few units to retain their cohesion and discipline in the chaos of the retreat. He took part in the 11 September 1922 Revolution, and became a member of the Revolutionary Committee, serving as chief of personnel affairs in the Ministry of Military Affairs afterwards. He was a witness for the prosecution at the Trial of the Six.

Promoted to major general, he commanded a division, and became commandant of the Hellenic Army Academy in 1929–30. He was dismissed from the Army following his participation in the failed Republican coup attempt of 1933. Following the failure of the March 1935 Republican coup, he was arrested and executed by the victorious royalist government. As his actual involvement in the coup was minimal, his execution is considered a royalist revenge act for his role in the Trial of the Six.
