= Georgios Giakoumakis =

Greek naval officer

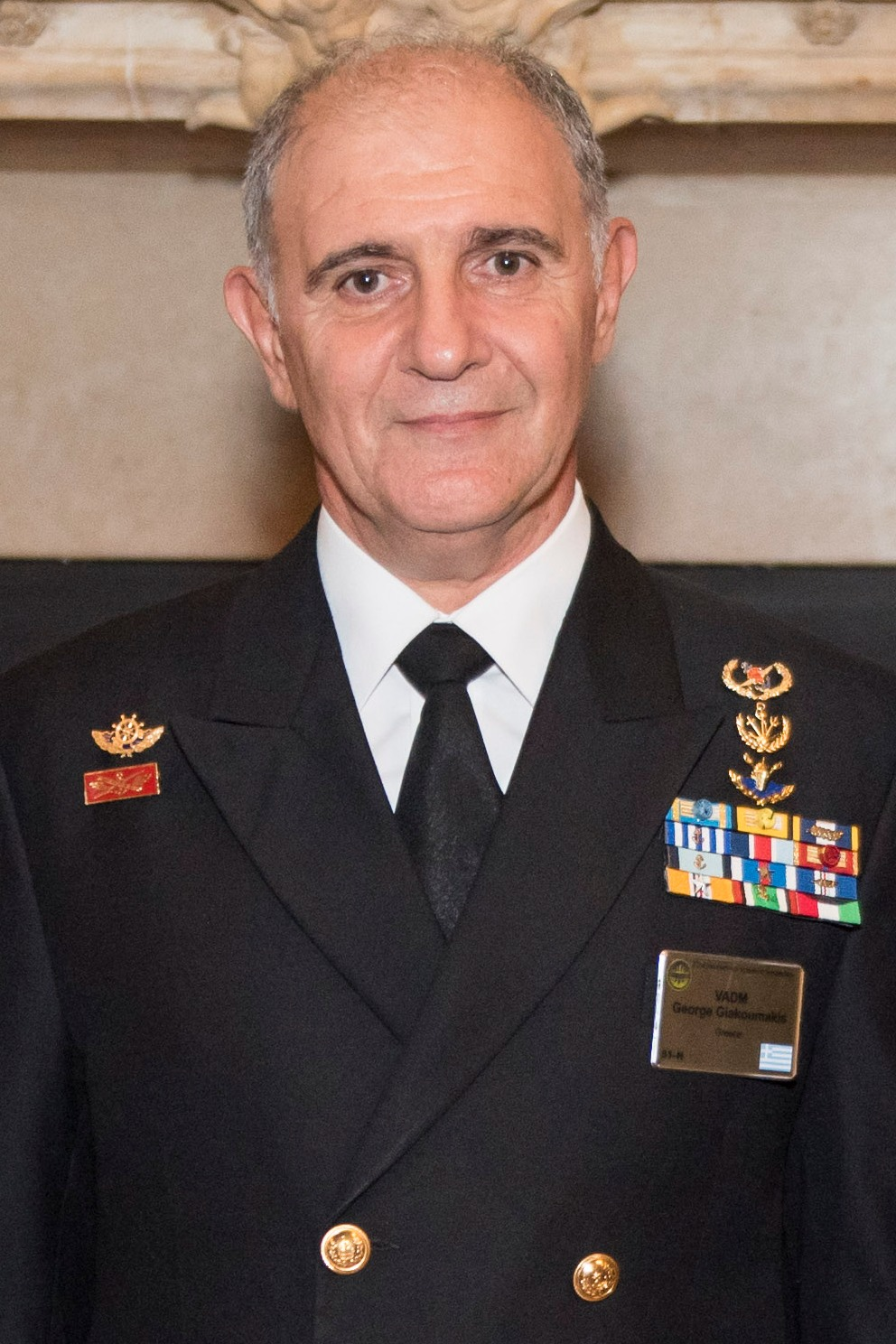
- Georgios Giakoumakis in September 2016
- Born: 29 June 1959 (age 67); Chania, Crete
- Military career
- Allegiance: Greece
- Branch: Hellenic Navy
- Service years: 1977–2017
- Rank: Vice Admiral
- Commands: Chief of the Navy General Staff

Vice Admiral Georgios Giakoumakis (Greek: Γεώργιος Γιακουμάκης; born 29 June 1959) is a Greek naval officer, and a former Chief of the Hellenic Navy General Staff.

== Career ==
He joined the Navy in 1977 and qualified as a communications officer. He commanded the frigate Kanaris and commanded the 1st Frigate Division.

He served as Deputy Commander in Chief of the Fleet, Deputy Commander of the Hellenic National Defence College and Commander of the Naval Training Command. He was then promoted to vice admiral and appointed Chief of the Fleet Command.

In 2015 he was appointed Chief of the Navy General Staff. Along with the chiefs of staff of the Army and the Air Force, he was dismissed by decision of the KYSEA on 16 January 2017 and replaced by Vice Admiral Nikolaos Tsounis, until then commander of the National Defence College.

== Education ==
He obtained a Master of Science degree in Electrical Engineering from the Naval Postgraduate School.

Military offices
| Preceded by Vice Admiral Evangelos Apostolakis | Chief of the Hellenic Navy General Staff; 15 September 2015 – 16 January 2017 | Succeeded by Vice Admiral Nikolaos Tsounis |
