= 1935 Greek coup d'état =

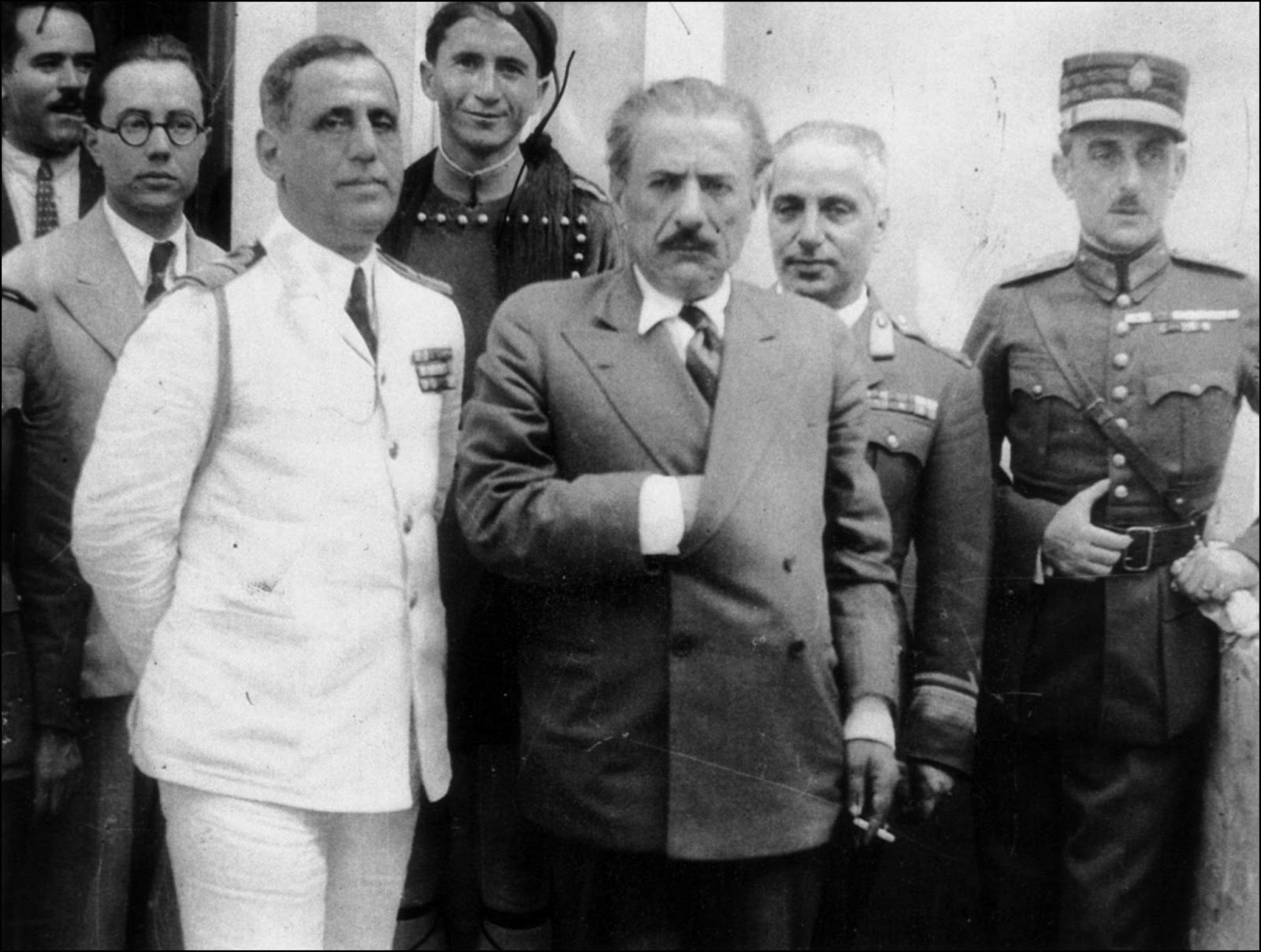
Leaders Dimitrios Oikonomou, Georgios Reppas, Georgios Kondylis, and Alexandros Papagos the day after the coup

The coup d'état of 10 October 1935 (Greek: Κίνημα της 10ης Οκτωβρίου 1935) was a coup in Greece. The coup was organized by pro-royalist military officers led by retired Major General Georgios Kondylis. Its aim was the overthrow of the legally elected government of Panagis Tsaldaris. The leaders of the Hellenic Armed Forces, Alexandros Papagos, Georgios Reppas, and Dimitrios Oikonomou forced the resignation of Tsaldaris and pushed to restore the monarchy.

The coup leaders considered Tsaldaris incapable of handling the restoration of the monarchy, after the 1935 Greek parliamentary election, despite Tsaldaris's party also being pro-royalist.

The successful coup saw the creation of a government with Kondylis as prime minister and Papagos as minister of military affairs. This government was presented before Parliament after its return from summer holidays. In protest of the seizure of power, Tsaldaris and 165 deputies of his People's Party left the session. The remaining 82 deputies affirmed the new government, temporarily restored the 1911 Constitution, and scheduled a referendum on the restoration of the monarchy. Kondylis became regent in addition to prime minister, and forced the resignation of President Alexandros Zaimis.

The subsequent referendum, held 3 November, was conducted under the shadow of martial law and was boycotted by the Venizelists, resulting in an overwhelming vote in favor of restoration of the monarchy. Later that month, George II returned to Greece and to the throne. He assigned formation of a new government to Konstantinos Demertzis, though Demertzis would die of a heart attack the next year.

== See also ==
- 1935 Greek coup attempt, a coup attempt in March of the same year
