= Nikolaos Pappas =

- Nikolaos Pappas as Vice Admiral, 1980s
- Born: 21 June 1930; Kymi
- Died: 5 April 2013 (aged 82); Athens
- Military career
- Allegiance: Greece
- Branch: Hellenic Navy
- Service years: 1948–1973, 1974–1986
- Rank: Admiral
- Commands: Leon (D-54), Velos, Hellenic Navy General Staff
- Other work: Minister for Mercantile Marine in 1989–1990

Nikolaos Pappas (Greek: Νικόλαος Παππάς; 21 June 1930 – 5 April 2013) was a Hellenic Navy admiral who, as commander of the destroyer Velos, played a major part in the abortive rebellion of the Navy in May 1973 against the ruling military junta. After the restoration of democracy he served as chief of the Hellenic Navy General Staff in 1982–1986 and Minister for Mercantile Marine in 1989–1990.

== Biography ==
Pappas was born in Kymi on 21 June 1930. He entered the Hellenic Naval Academy in September 1948, and graduated on 7 April 1952 as an Ensign. He served as commander of the minesweepers Salaminia and Kalymnos, being promoted to Second Lieutenant on 11 April 1955. He then commanded the hydrographic survey ship Vegas, before being sent to Britain in 1958–59 to attend the British Royal Navy's Navigation School.

On his return, he was promoted to Lieutenant (18 April 1959), and assumed command of the gunboats Arslanoglou (1960) and Pezopoulos (1962). In 1963–65 he was adjutant to the Minister for National Defence. Promoted to Lieutenant Commander on 11 June 1965 (later retroactive to 7 April 1964), he commanded the LST Lesvos in 1965–67 and the destroyer Leon in 1967–68. In the latter capacity he received a commendation from the Chief of the Hellenic Navy General Staff and the Minister for Mercantile Marine for his role, despite extremely difficult weather conditions, in the rescue of the crew of the steamer Stratoniki, which sank on 7 September 1967.

In 1968 he graduated from the Navy War School and was promoted to Commander on 4 September 1968 (later retroactive to 7 April). In 1968–69 he served as Chief of the B1 Bureau (Personnel) of the Hellenic Navy General Staff, then until 1971 he headed the Navy Command's (the renamed HNGS) 5th and 3rd Staff Bureaux. In 1971 he graduated from the NATO Defense College, and in 1971–72 he headed the Navy's Training Centre at Poros and the Naval NCO Academy.

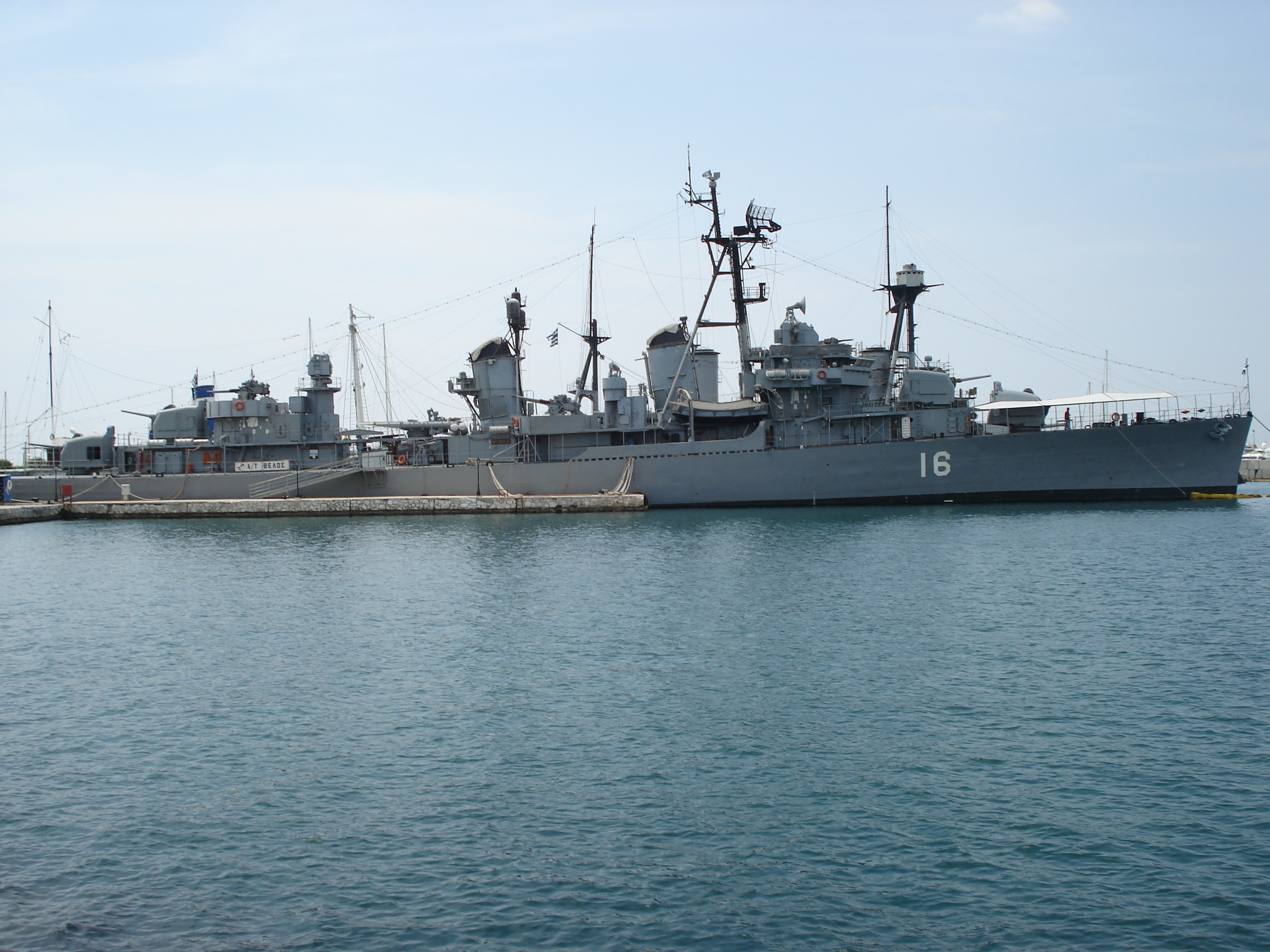
The Velos as it is today, moored as a museum ship in Faliro

In 1972 Pappas assumed command of the destroyer Velos, with which he participated in the abortive Navy revolt, planned for 25 May 1973, against the then-ruling military junta. Although the revolt was pre-empted by the junta, Pappas led his own vessel, the destroyer Velos, to Italy, where he and 31 of the ship's officers and NCOs requested political asylum, and gave a press conference in front of the international media where he denounced the regime. In retaliation, the regime dismissed him from the Navy and stripped him of his citizenship.

After the fall of the junta in 1974, Pappas was reinstated in his rank and was promoted to captain (retroactively since 23 June 1974). He served as chief of the Administration Command of the Salamis Naval Base until 1976. He then went to London as defence attaché until 1979, and returned to assume command of the Fast Attack Craft Flotilla (1979–80). Promoted to commodore on 20 December 1979, he then assumed command of the Destroyers Command (1980–82), was promoted to rear admiral (5 January 1982) and was appointed head of the Naval Training Command (1982). On 23 March 1982 he was promoted to vice admiral and named as Chief of the Navy General Staff, a post which he retained until his retirement as a full admiral and honorary chief of the HNGS on 22 December 1986.

During the political crisis of 1989–90, he served as Minister for Mercantile Marine in the caretaker government of Ioannis Grivas and the national unity government of Xenophon Zolotas.

Pappas died at his residence in Athens, following a battle with cancer, on 5 April 2013. He was married and had two sons, Velisarios and Panayiotis (Takis) Pappas.

== Honours ==
Admiral Pappas had received the following Greek and foreign decorations:

- Grand Commander of the Order of the Phoenix (Greece)
- Grand Commander of the Order of Honour (Greece)
- Gold Cross of the Order of George I (Greece)
- First Class of the Medal of Military Merit (Greece)
- Grand Decoration of Honour in Gold with Star of the Decoration of Honour for Services to the Republic of Austria

Political offices
Preceded by Aristotelis Pavlidis	Minister for Mercantile Marine; 12 October 1989 – 11 April 1990	Succeeded by Konstantinos Mitsotakis
Military offices
Preceded by Vice Admiral Odysseas Kapetos	Chief of the Hellenic Navy General Staff; 23 March 1982 – 22 December 1986	Succeeded by Vice Admiral Leonidas Vasilikopoulos
