= Antonis Antoniadis (admiral) =

Greek naval officer

- Born: 2 June 1946 (age 79) Athens, Greece
- Allegiance: Greece
- Branch: Hellenic Navy
- Service years: 1963–2005
- Rank: Admiral
- Commands: Chief of the Hellenic Navy General Staff

Admiral Antonis Antoniadis (Greek: Αντώνης Αντωνιάδης) is a Greek naval officer, who served as Chief of the Hellenic Navy General Staff in 2002–2005.

== Career ==
He was born in Athens on 2 June 1946 to Xenofon Antoniadis, a Hellenic Coast Guard officer. He entered the Hellenic Navy Academy on 20 September 1963 and graduated on 18 September 1967 as a Line Ensign. In 1969 he trained with the US 6th Fleet, and was promoted to Sub-Lieutenant on 30 September 1970, and Lieutenant on 30 September 1974. In 1974–1975 he attended a specialist artillery course in the United States, followed by a course on the OTO Melara 76 mm gun in Italy in 1976. He was promoted to Lt. Commander on 28 September 1979 and served as captain of the vehicle carrier Roussen in 1980–1981, as well as adjutant to the Deputy Defence Minister Antonis Drosogiannis in 1981–1983. He attended the Naval War School in 1983, and was promoted to Commander on 12 April 1984.

Following a succession of staff assignments, in 1987–1990 he served in the Greek mission to the NATO Military Committee. In 1990–1991 he commanded the destroyer Sfendoni, and was promoted to Captain on 10 September 1991. In 1994–1995 he served as head of the Landing Ships Command and the Amphibious Operations School, being promoted to Commodore on 17 March 1995. He then served as Director of Defence Policy in the Hellenic National Defence General Staff until 1998. Promoted to rear admiral on 3 March 1998, he served as head of the Navy Supply Command in 1998–1999, and of the Navy Training Command in 1999–2000. After promotion to vice admiral on 2 May 2000, he became Chief of the Fleet Command in 2001–2002. In 2002 he attended the Joint National Defence Staff School, and served as Chief of the Hellenic Navy General Staff in 2002–2005. He retired on 16 February 2005 with the honorary rank of admiral in retirement.

== Sources ==
Military offices
Preceded by Vice Admiral Georgios Theodoroulakis	Chief of the Hellenic Navy General Staff; 5 March 2002 – 15 February 2005	Succeeded by Vice Admiral Dimitrios Gousis
