= Konstantinos Typaldos-Alfonsatos =

Greek Navy officer (1873–1945)

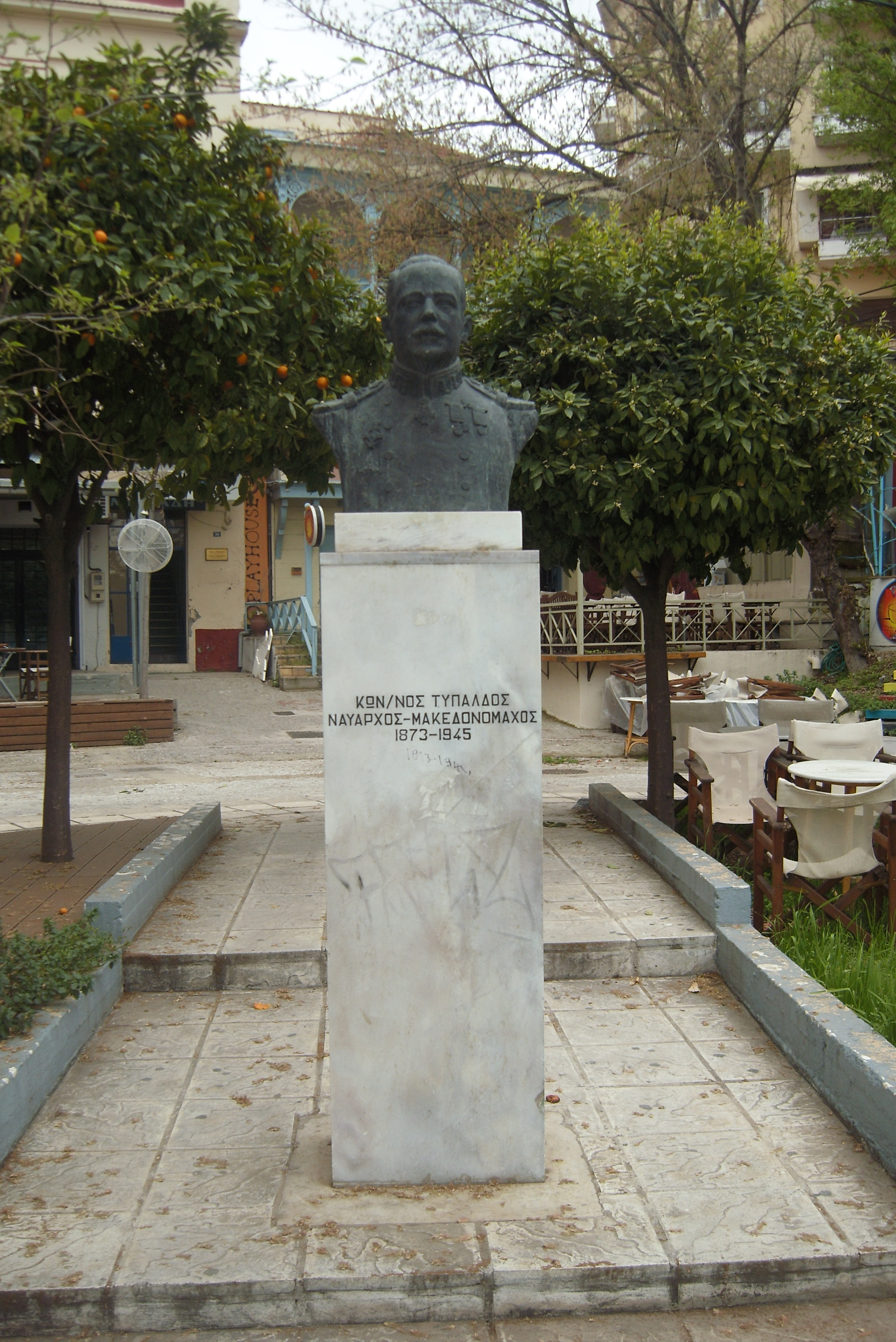
- Bust of Typaldos-Alfonsatos in Kavala
- Born: 1873; Athens
- Died: 28 February 1945
- Military career
- Allegiance: Kingdom of Greece (1891–17, 1920–22); Second Hellenic Republic (1926–31)
- Branch: Hellenic Navy
- Service years: 1891–17, 1920–22, 1926–31
- Rank: Vice Admiral
- Wars: Greco-Turkish War of 1897, Macedonian Struggle; Balkan Wars

Konstantinos Typaldos-Alfonsatos (Greek: Κωνσταντίνος Τυπάλδος-Αλφονσάτος, 1873–1945) was a Greek Navy officer. He served briefly as Minister for Naval Affairs (1922), Chief of the Hellenic Navy General Staff (1927), and Inspector General of the Navy (1929–31), retiring with the rank of vice admiral.

== Life ==
Born in Athens in 1873, Konstantinos Typaldos-Alfonsatos entered the Hellenic Navy Academy on 2 September 1887 and graduated on 31 August 1891 as a Line Ensign. In 1897, on board torpedo boat 16, he participated in the naval operations around Crete, as well as in the subsequent Greco-Turkish War. During the latter conflict he took part in the landing operations at Leptokarya; when his captain, Sub-Lieutenant Emmanouil Antoniadis, was killed, he took over command of the vessel.

Promoted to Sub-Lieutenant on 9 January 1899, he was appointed captain of gunboat A in 1900, and promoted to lieutenant on 15 November 1902. In 1908–09 he was active in the Macedonian Struggle, as head of the Drama–Kavala area. He participated in the Goudi coup in August 1909, but soon disagreed with the moderate leadership and launched his own abortive coup on 16 October 1909, in which the Light Squadron of destroyers, under his command, confronted the Battleship Squadron and forcefully denied it entry into the Salamis Naval Base. The coup failed, but Typaldos and his supporters were amnestied in January 1910. On 26 March 1910 he was promoted to Lieutenant First Class, and to Lt. Commander on 17 July of the same year. During the First Balkan War he commanded the destroyer Niki, with which he participated in the Battle of Lemnos and the operations for the capture of Lesbos and Samos. In early June 1913, he was given command of the newly established 29th Naval Regiment, formed of naval personnel, which he led in the Second Balkan War against Bulgaria fighting in the area of Strumica, and then leading the temporary capture of Western Thrace. During the war, he was promoted to commander, on 1 July 1913.

After the Balkan Wars, he commanded the destroyer Leon. Promoted to captain on 13 April 1915, he went on to serve as Inspector of Port Authorities, before being forced onto suspended service on 20 June 1917 after the exile of King Constantine I of Greece and the unification of Greece under the leadership of Eleftherios Venizelos. On 20 December 1917, he went into retirement. After the electoral victory of the royalist parties in November 1920, he was reinstated to active service on 10 November, and was promoted to rear admiral on 2 December. He was also elected an MP for Cephalonia, and in May 1922 served as Minister for Naval Affairs in the short-lived cabinet (3–9 May) of Nikolaos Stratos.

After the Greek defeat in the Asia Minor Campaign and the outbreak of the 11 September 1922 Revolution he voluntarily retired on 30 September, but was restored in August 1926 along with other former royalist officers. He served as Chief of the Navy General Staff in 1927, and as Inspector-General of the Navy in 1929–31, retiring as vice admiral in retirement on 19 January 1931.

He died on 28 February 1945.

Political offices
Preceded by Georgios Baltatzis (pro tempore)	Minister for Naval Affairs; 3–9 May 1922	Succeeded by Ioannis Leonidas
Military offices
Preceded by Captain Ioannis Demestichas	Chief of the Navy General Staff; 17 February – 15 July 1927	Succeeded by Rear Admiral Konstantinos Malikopoulos
