= Christos Louis =

Greek molecular geneticist

Christos (Kitsos) Louis
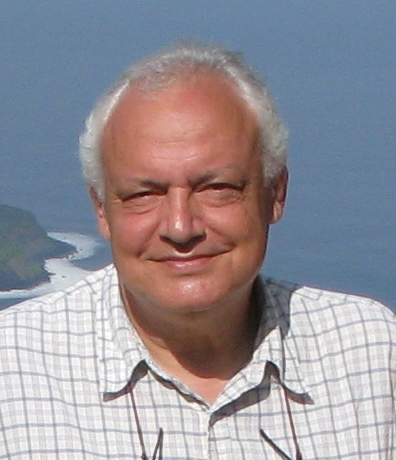
- Louis in 2013
- Born: November 11, 1948; Athens, Greece
- Scientific career
- Fields: Genomics Molecular biology
- Workplaces: Deutsches Krebsforschungszentrum, Biozentrum University of Basel, Princeton University, University of Crete, IMBB, University of Perugia
- Doctoral advisor: Prof. Constantin E. Sekeris

Christos Louis, nicknamed Kitsos, is a Greek molecular geneticist. He graduated from the Medical School of the University of Marburg in 1974 and joined the team of Prof. C.E. Sekeris, first at Marburg and then at the German Cancer Research Center Heidelberg, obtaining his doctoral degree in cell biology from Heidelberg University in 1977. His work focuses on genomics and bioinformatics of insects and vector-borne/tropical diseases.

He performed postdoctoral research as a European Molecular Biology Organization (EMBO) fellow with Walter J. Gehring at the Biozentrum University of Basel (1978–1979) and Paul Schedl at the Department of Biology at Princeton University (1980–1983). Fotis Kafatos invited him to join the staff of the Institute of Molecular Biology and Biotechnology (IMBB) of the, then, Research Centre of Crete in 1983; he subsequently became a member of the Faculty of the Department of Biology at the University of Crete where he was promoted to Full Professor in 1989. During his tenure he was the chairman of his department for a total of 11 years. Later, he was a founding member of the University of Crete's Programme on Bioethics. He retired from the university in 2014 although, as an emeritus, he kept his appointment as research staff at the IMBB, now an Institute of the Foundation for Research & Technology – Hellas.

From December 2012 till April 2015 he was also the acting head of bioinformatics at the Centre for Functional Genomics at the Dept. of Experimental Medicine of the University of Perugia. He has served on a number of national (Greek) and international committees and boards, and he is a member of EMBO. He was a member of several standing and ad hoc committees of the World Health Organization/TDR, including its Scientific and Technical Advisory Committee (STAC). Kitsos Louis has been a member of the editorial boards of several scientific journals and has co-authored more than 180 scientific publications. After his retirement from active research, he concentrated on writing books of popular science, one of which ("Ιστορίες Γενετικής στην Καθομιλουμένη"-Genetics in everyday language, Crete University Press) was awarded a Special Prize by the Athens Academy in 2021.

His research interests include:

- Insect Molecular Genetics with emphasis on genomics; genome sequencing and post-genomic expression analysis. He was a member of the European Drosophila Genome Project and the Anopheles Genome Project.
- Study of the molecular interactions between Anopheles and the Malaria parasite.
- Development of biomedical ontologies, especially for medical entomology, and databases. With his colleagues in Crete, he developed AnoDB/AnoBase, the first genetic databases for Anopheles, which later evolved into VectorBase.
- Epidemiology and biology of vector-borne diseases.

In his youth, Kitsos Louis was a competition swimmer for Panathinaikos A.O. having won several Greek national championships.
