= Greek destroyer Leon (D54) =

Greek destroyer, originally USS Eldridge

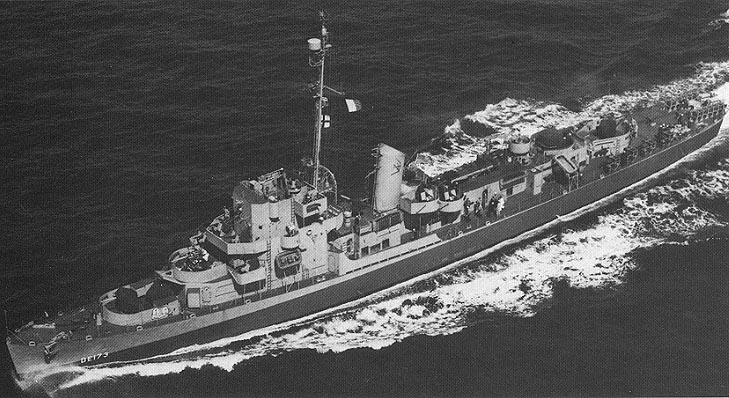
- USS Eldridge (DE-173) ca. 1944

History

United States
- Name: Eldridge
- Namesake: John Eldridge Jr.
- Ordered: 1942
- Builder: Federal Shipbuilding and Drydock Company, Newark, New Jersey
- Laid down: 22 February 1943
- Launched: 25 July 1943
- Commissioned: 27 August 1943
- Decommissioned: 17 June 1946
- Stricken: 26 March 1951
- Fate: Sold to Greece, 15 January 1951

Greece
- Name: Leon
- Acquired: 15 January 1951
- Decommissioned: 15 November 1992
- Fate: Sold for scrap, 11 November 1999

General characteristics
- Class & type: Cannon-class destroyer escort
- Displacement: 1,240 long tons (1,260 t) standard; 1,620 long tons (1,646 t) full
- Length: 306 ft (93 m) o/a; 300 ft (91 m) w/l
- Beam: 36 ft 10 in (11.23 m)
- Draft: 11 ft 8 in (3.56 m)
- Propulsion: 4 × GM Mod. 16-278A diesel engines with electric drive, 6,000 shp (4,474 kW), 2 screws
- Speed: 21 knots (39 km/h; 24 mph)
- Range: 10,800 nmi (20,000 km) at 12 knots (22 km/h; 14 mph)
- Complement: 15 officers and 201 enlisted
- Armament: 3 × single Mk.22 3"/50 caliber guns; 1 × twin 40 mm Mk.1 AA gun; 8 × 20 mm Mk.4 AA guns; 3 × 21 in (533 mm) torpedo tubes; 1 × Hedgehog Mk.10 anti-submarine mortar (144 rounds); 8 × Mk.6 depth charge projectors; 2 × Mk.9 depth charge tracks

Leon (D54) (Greek: Α/Τ Λέων, "Lion") was a Cannon-class destroyer that served with the Greek Navy between 1951 and 1992. The ship had formerly served with the United States Navy under the name USS Eldridge (DE-173), famous for its alleged role in the Philadelphia Experiment.

== Service history ==
Leon was transferred to Greece under the Mutual Defense Assistance Program. It was put to service in January 1951 by Vice Admiral D. Foifas. She was used mainly for patrols in the Eastern Aegean Sea and for cadet officer (midshipmen) training.

Leon was decommissioned on November 15. 1992 and later in November 1999 it was sold as scrap to the Piraeus-based V&J Scrapmetal Trading Ltd.

== Sister ships ==
Leon belonged to a group of four Cannon-class destroyers that were transferred to the Greek Navy in 1951. The other three were Ierax (D31) (Greek: Ιέραξ, "Hawk"), Aetos (D01) (Greek: Άετός, "Eagle") and Panthir (D67) (Greek: Πάνθηρ, "Panther"), affectionately known as the Thiria (Greek: Θηρία, "Beasts").
