= Greek ship Elli =

Three ships of the Hellenic Navy have borne the name Elli (Έλλη), named after the First Balkan War Battle of Elli:

- Greek cruiser Elli (1912) (1914–1940), a protected cruiser
- Greek cruiser Elli (1935) (1947–1965), ex-Italian cruiser Eugenio di Savoia, handed over as war reparations
- Greek frigate Elli (1982–present), lead ship of the Elli-class frigates
