= Stylianos Petrakis =

Greek naval officer

- Στυλιανός Πετράκης
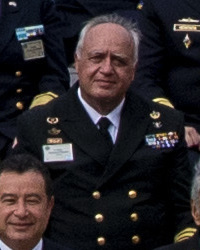
- Born: Episkopi, Rethymno, Crete
- Military career
- Allegiance: Greece
- Branch: Hellenic Navy
- Rank: Vice Admiral
- Commands: Chief of the Navy General Staff

Stylianos Petrakis (Greek: Στυλιανός Πετράκης) is a Greek naval officer. He was appointed as Chief of the Hellenic Navy General Staff on 17 January 2020. He was replaced in January 2023 by Vice Admiral Ioannis Drymousis.
