= 1933 Greek coup attempt =

On the morning of March 6, 1933, following the parliamentary elections held on March 5, a military operation commenced in Athens, Greece under the leadership of the retired Lieutenant General Nikolaos Plastiras. Plastiras, who had withdrawn from political involvement since 1924, re-emerged to obstruct the People's Party from establishing a government, in support of the "National Coalition". This movement came in the wake of the electoral victory of the United Opposition, a coalition opposing Eleftherios Venizelos, spearheaded by Panagios Tsaldaris of the People's Party.

Evidence strongly suggests that Nikolaos Plastiras, the principal architect of the coup, proceeded with at least the tacit approval, if not the active encouragement, of Eleftherios Venizelos who was motivated by the poor results of the 1933 Greek legislative election.

== Background ==
From the evening of the election day, as initial reports indicating widespread public dissatisfaction and a definitive rejection of Venizelism started reaching Athens, signs of unrest among the military became apparent. At the former residence of Venizelos (currently the mansion of the British Ambassador on V. Sofias Avenue, across from the Byzantine Museum), a comprehensive security perimeter was established, manned by armed soldiers and gendarmes, supported by tanks and machine guns.

The building was conspicuously lit, serving as the venue for an extended meeting between Venizelos, Plastiras, and other government officials. Notably, in their own constituencies, ministers from Venizelos's administration, including A. Papanastasiou, A. Michalakopoulos, K. Gotsis, Andreas Markos, Kremesis, and Th. Sofoulis, experienced significant declines in voter support.

Around 2:30 a.m., amidst a spontaneous demonstration weaving through Athens' streets, a revolutionary proclamation was dispatched to the "Eleftheros Vima" newspaper's printing facilities for mass production. By approximately 4:30 a.m. on March 6, under directives purportedly issued by Plastiras, who was assumed to be the orchestrator of the movement, vehicles transporting armed soldiers took control of the buildings and assets of newspapers opposing Venizelos, seizing all their documents. Concurrently, armed groups took over various governmental and public buildings. In these early hours, members of the Security (Gendarmerie) apprehended individuals such as I. Rallis and G. Stratos. Additionally, a contingent approached the residence of Chaldaris, located on Ch. Trikoupis Street. Citing health reasons, Chaldaris declined to accompany them, resulting in his house arrest. During this period, those aligned with Chaldaris' political rallies started disseminating rumors about the People's Party leader, leading crowds to gather at the Parliament and his residence to catch a glimpse of him. In response to the chants from the assembled crowd, Chaldaris appeared on his balcony, appealing for calm.

Simultaneously, at midday, Venizelos made a visit to the President of the Republic, Alexandros Zaimis, at his residence in Faliro to communicate his decision to resign. Following this meeting, Venizelos returned to his own home to hold a cabinet meeting, during which he and his ministers tendered their resignations. They prepared official decrees reflecting their resignations, which were subsequently forwarded to the President of the Republic.

In the meantime, Chaldaris reached out to the former police chief, requesting him to assume control over the police force. Concurrently, Plastiras extended an invitation to the director of the gendarmerie, Papadimitriou, to come to the Ministry of Military Affairs. The purpose of this meeting was to orchestrate the forcible dispersion of the crowds gathered outside Chaldaris' residence, authorizing the use of weapons and promising military support if necessary.

Venizelos, leading the "Liberals", faced a significant electoral setback, which contextualizes the encouragement for Plastiras's actions.
