= 1935 Greek coup attempt =

Attempted coup d'état in Greece

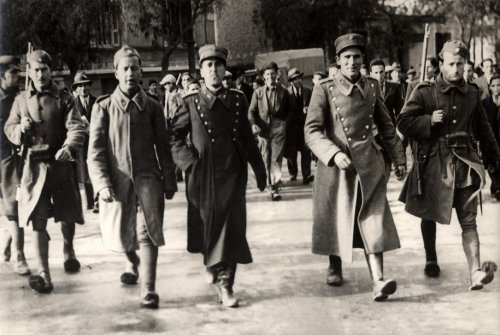
Rebel Greek officers under guard following the suppression of the coup

The attempted coup d'état of March 1935 (Greek: Κίνημα του 1935) was a Venizelist revolt against the People's Party government of Panagis Tsaldaris, which was suspected of pro-royalist tendencies.

The coup was headed by Nikolaos Plastiras, and broke out on 1 March 1935, but failed to establish itself in Athens and most of mainland Greece. The government quickly reacted, and loyal forces under the leadership of General Georgios Kondylis put the revolt down by March 11, when Venizelos himself was forced to flee Greece. In the coup's aftermath, a military tribunal was set up, which purged the Armed Forces of Venizelist and Republican officers, and ordered the execution of two prominent Venizelist generals, Anastasios Papoulas and Miltiadis Koimisis, and major Stamatis Volanis on April 24. Venizelos and Plastiras likewise were condemned to death in absentia. In the political sphere, the failure of the revolt marked the triumph of anti-Venizelist forces, and actually quickened the collapse of the fragile Second Hellenic Republic. Its final death blow was given in October, when the Armed Forces overthrew the government in a coup (due to their consideration of Tsaldari's stance towards the immediate restoration of monarchy as indecisive, and due to personal motives of Kondylis and his political and military circle), and Kondylis declared himself regent for the restored monarchy.

== Causes ==
The coup was the resultant of conspiratorial actions of various circles and organizations of the Venizelist faction, who aimed to the deterrence of the restoration of the crowned democracy. Behind this goal was the desire of the Venizelists officers, who were dismissed, to return to the army and proceed into radical purges of the dissidents as well as the pursuit of the policies of the same party to return to power.

The concerns of the Venizelists for the future of the democracy were perhaps not entirely justified because, despite all the challenges of the royal fanatics, the regime was not seriously in danger, much less even by fanatical enemies, who were a powerless minority. The People's Party, which housed the majority of the old royalists, had recognized in 1932 the republic and had undertaken to work in the framework of this regime. Although the leadership and the press refused to renounce crowned democracy, their refusal was related probably to the reasonable desire not to cause a portion of their voters rather than by their fanatical devotion to the royal institution.

From the causes of the Movement stand out two. The attempt in June 1933 against the life of Venizelos and its impact on the mentality and actions of the elder politician and the gradual debarment of the underpinnings of Venizelist – democratic faction in the army, occasioned by the Plastiras movement on March 6, 1933.

The attempt of 1933 convinced Venizelos that his political opponents would not hesitate to use and this belief, such as his belief that his party and the country generally needed his services, certainly contributed in decision making that only unfortunate can be characterized.

His encouragement and fomenting of conspiratorial organizations in the army, with ineffable but real purpose the defense of the Venizelist composition of the army, betray a lack of self-control. Such organizations were the "Greek Military Organization" and the "Democratic Defense".

The first was formed by officers who served in the army and the leaders were lieutenant colonel Christodoulos Tsigantes, his brother captain Ioannis Tsigantes, colonel Stefanos Sarafis and others. The purpose of the organization was to prevent Georgios Kondylis to impose with his own movement dictatorship, and to prepare military coup in order to prevent potential change of the regime. The second organization, the "Democratic Defense" was constituted by demobilized Venizelists officers. Leaders were the generals Anastasios Papoulas and Stylianos Gonatas but the true leader was Nikolaos Plastiras. These two organizations were united with the initiative Venizelist politician Alexandros Zannas with the common goal to defend the regime.

These concerns of Venizelos and of the leadership of Venizelos' faction were strengthened by the occasional dismissals of Venizelists officers and stated objectives of those in power after 1932 were to remove their opponents from the army and the state apparatus in general and to substitute them in every sector and in every means. It was the reaction of political leadership that had been identified with the power and the state, after a long and a one-party government, and refused to leave power and let a field clear to the opponents of establishing a similar long-term and one-party regime. The invocation of political and state authorities and the references to national schism gave the necessary ideological status in the fight of totalitarian domination. This leadership preferred to remain captive of an ideological epiphenomenon, which did not correspond to political and social incisions and the country's problems. It is characteristic that the resurgence of the schism coincides in time with the first, after ten years of one-party Venizelist governance, effective challenge by the opposition party. References to the dangers that threatened the republic began to multiply and to be intensified since the People's Party recognized the regime and undertook to respect it, either as a government or as an opposition party.

== The coup ==
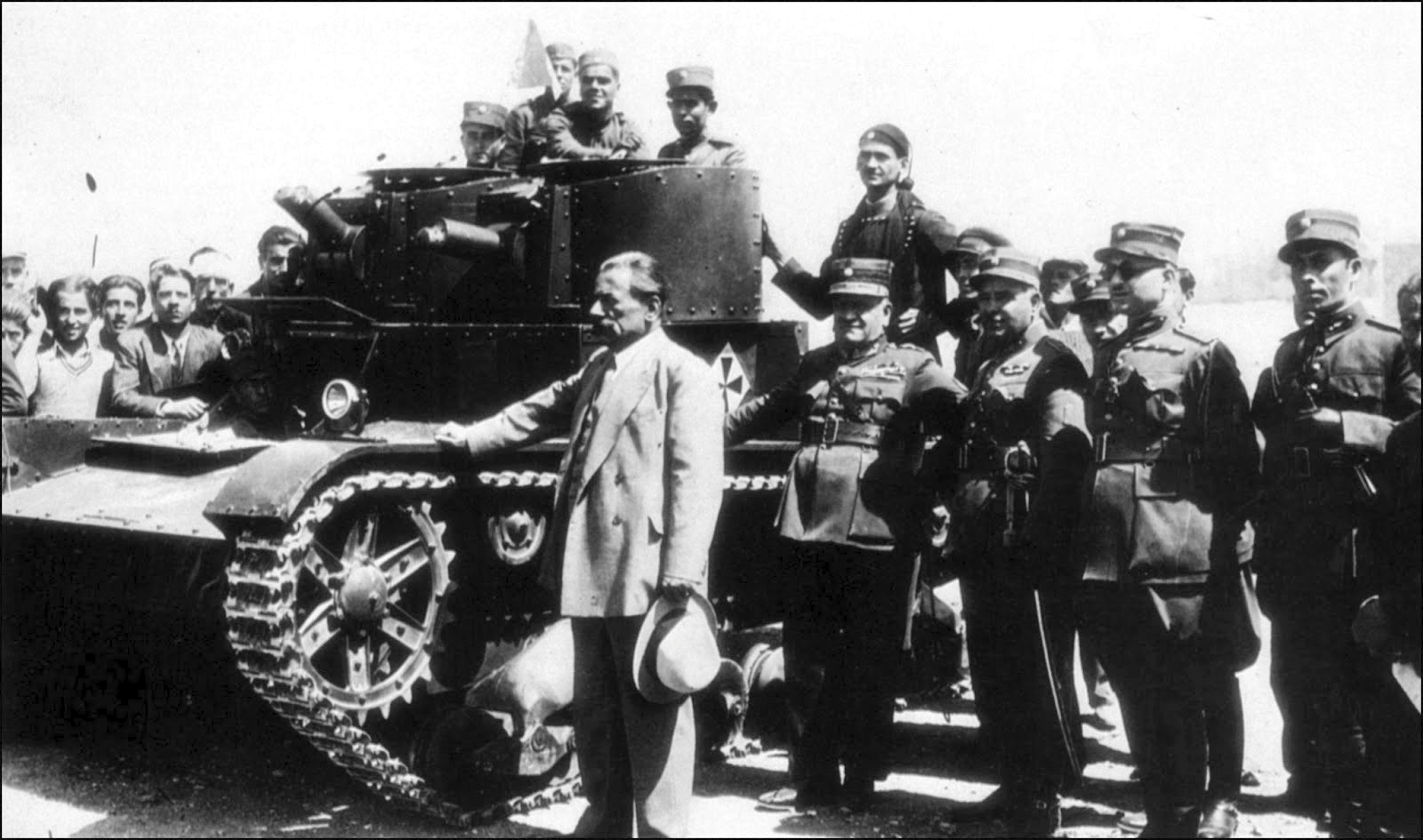
Minister of Military Affairs Georgios Kondylis with a tank shortly before the coup attempt

Conspirators intended to capture the fleet, which, according to their plans, played a key role in the success of their movement. Their aim was still the military forces based in Thessaloniki and Kavala, and which would put under their control. By controlling the fleet, the guards in Thessaloniki, Kavala, Crete and the Aegean islands, the people of the Movement would form a temporary government in Thessaloniki, if in the meantime the government in Athens not submitted resignation, where the initiates officers would try to put under their control guards the capital to create distraction.

The coup failed in its first and crucial phase, when the fleet instead of Thessaloniki, headed to Crete, where Venizelos took over leadership of the Movement, but not without hesitation. The guards in northern Greece rebelled too late, and the ones of the capital were again under the government's control, as soon after the onset of the Movement. In the meantime, the government of Panagis Tsaldaris reacted dynamically by assigning the suppression of the Movement to the Minister of Military Affairs Georgios Kondylis and by hiring Ioannis Metaxas as Minister of State.

Kondylis with headquarters in Thessaloniki, quickly suppressed the Movement in Macedonia after a series of conflicts and the leader of the rebels in the area major general Kammenos, commander of the 4th army corps in Kavala, forced to take refuge on March 11 in Bulgaria. Eventually, the fleet was surrendered, while Venizelos fled to Kasos (Dodecanese were under Italian occupation) and requested political asylum. Basically, the Movement collapsed, which was due to the lack of a generally accepted military leader, the faulty design and the improper performance of projects, the rivalries of different groups and the lack of coordination. Finally, the Movement had only a minimal impact on the people, who felt discomfort and fatigue from the arbitrary interference of the military in politics.

== Impact of the coup ==
The consequences of the coup were serious both for Venizelist party and for the country in general. Eleftherios Venizelos was forced to leave the country and he died a year later in exile in Paris. Political leaders of the Venizelist faction, including Venizelos and Plastiras, who was sentenced to death, were tried and sentenced to various severe or light sentences in a display of vengeful dispositions by those in power. The military leadership of the Movement, including senior officers, as Stefanos Sarafis and brothers Tsigante, were put on trial by emergency military courts and were convicted, publicly humiliated and were dismissed from the army. Mass reprisals were avoided – three officers were executed, the cavalry major Volánıs and the generals Papoúlas and Koımísıs, not necessarily all of them responsible – when moderate elements of the government and the anti-Venizelist faction in general were prevailed.

But the most important, in terms of long-term effects, was that the most important part of Venizelist and Republican military and navy officers was dismissed. The dismissal of Venizelist officers, more than any other action or moderation of the winning faction, neutralized the foundations of the Venizelist faction in the army and facilitated not only on the eve of anti-Venizelist party in power, but also the gradual creation of a one-party state. Determined to proceed to the complete liquidation of the state apparatus of Venizelos elements, Tsaldaris's government abolished the lifelong operation of the court and suspended the permanence of civil employee. Also, the government abolished the Senate dissolved the parliament and announced elections for a Constituent Assembly in June 1935.
