= War Cross (Greece) =

War Cross Polemikos Stavros Πολεμικός Σταυρός
- 1974 version, design as finalized in 2003. L-R: 1st, 2nd and 3rd classes
- Type: Military decoration
- Awarded for: Acts of valor during war
- Country: Greece
- Eligibility: Greek and Allied military personnel
- Established: 28 February 1917
- Ribbon of the medal (1940 and 1974 versions)

Precedence
- Next (higher): Cross of Valour
- Next (lower): Medal for Outstanding Acts

The War Cross (Greek: Πολεμικός Σταυρός) is a military decoration of Greece, awarded for heroism in wartime to both Greeks and foreign allies. There have been three versions of the cross, the 1917 version covering World War I, the 1940 version covering the Second World War and the Greek Civil War, and the 1974 version covering peacekeeping missions in the subsequent years.

== 1917 version ==
1917 version. L-R: 1st, 2nd and 3rd classes

=== Establishment and history ===
The first version was established by the Venizelist "National Defence" Government on 28 February 1917, and confirmed by Royal Decree on 31 October, shortly after the entry of the whole of Greece in the First World War. Its creation was inspired by the French Croix de guerre, and it was awarded to military personnel of all branches for acts of valour in the Macedonian front (1916–1918), the Allied Expedition to Ukraine (1919) and the Greco-Turkish War of 1919–1922 (rarely after 1920 due to its Venizelist connotations). In addition, from 1919, the first class could be awarded to the war flags of distinguished regiments.

=== Design and awards ===
The medal was designed by the French sculptor André Rivaud, featuring a silver medal consisting of a vertical sword on a circular wreath, with a horizontal plaque, bearing the ancient Spartan motto "Η ΤΑΝ Η ΕΠΙ ΤΑΣ" ("[return home] either with your shield, or upon it") underneath. The reverse bears the inscription "ΕΛΛΑΣ" ("Greece") and underneath the dates "1916–1917". The ribbon was black, edged with blue, and 35–37 mm wide. The cross was awarded in three classes, distinguished by the devices born on the ribbon: the 3rd class being plain, the 2nd class bearing a bronze five-pointed star, and the 1st class a bronze palm leaf. Subsequent awards were designated by the addition of silver five-pointed stars on the ribbon.

=== Later use ===
The 1917 design was later adopted as the insignia of the Sacred Squadron, and post-war, used by the State for disabled veterans, including license plates.

== 1940 version ==
1940 version. L-R: 1st, 2nd and 3rd classes

=== Establishment and history ===
The Venizelist associations of the 1917 cross meant that, when Greece found itself at war again in October 1940 after the Italian invasion, the staunchly royalist dictatorial government chose an entirely different design instead of simply re-establishing the old version. The new medal was instituted by Royal Decree on 11 November 1940 (Compulsory Law 2646/1940) and continued to be awarded throughout the Second World War. It was re-authorised on 19 April 1947 for the Greek Civil War (1946–1949) and extended until 1953, covering the Greek participation in the Korean War. It was awarded to Greek and Allied (mostly British and later US) military personnel, as well as to regimental war flags.

=== Design and awards ===
The medal's design is essentially a modification of the French Croix de Guerre, featuring a bronze cross pattée with the royal monogram (two crossed gammas and a crown) of King George II, atop two crossed swords, and topped by a royal crown. The reverse bears the date "1940". The ribbon features three equal alternating bands of red, blue and red. The cross was awarded in three classes, distinguished by the colour of the crown: bronze for the 3rd class, silver for the 2nd, and gold for the 1st class. Until 1942, the first award could be in any class, but according to Compulsory Law 3120/1942, the first award had always to be made in the 3rd class. Up to three subsequent awards remained in the same class (denoted by the number of miniature crowns on the ribbon), but the fifth and eighth awards upgraded the medal to the 2nd and 1st classes respectively. Several variations exist because many manufacturers were used, some in Greece and others in the United Kingdom, with minor variations in the style of the crown and the cross, as well as design of the obverse side (in some versions, the date lies within a circle).

== 1974 version ==
1974 version, 1985 provisional design. L-R: 1st, 2nd and 3rd classes

In 1974, during the last months of the Greek military junta and following the abolition of the monarchy in June 1973, the junta issued Law 376/74 on military medals, which revised the until then current regulations. It specified that the War Cross would have three classes, with the 1st class was reserved for senior officers and war flags, the 2nd class for mid-level officers and the 3rd class for junior and warrant officers, NCOs and privates.

Due to the fall of the junta and the restoration of democracy a few months later, the medal was not officially redesigned at the time. In 1985, a provisional version was cut. It retained the same basic design as the 1940 version, but without the royal cypher, which was replaced by an oak wreath, and the crowns, which were replaced by bronze, silver and gold versions of the national emblem of Greece for the 3rd, 2nd and 1st classes respectively. The reverse bore the legend "ΕΛΛΗΝΙΚΗ ΔΗΜΟΚΡΑΤΙΑ" ("Hellenic Republic"). Four medals of the 1st class were issued to war flags of units participating in UN peacekeeping missions.

The design was finalized in Presidential Decree 159 of 17 March 2003. It retains the basic design of the 1940 and 1985 crosses, but the national emblem has been moved to the center of the cross, in bronze, silver and gold versions for the 3rd, 2nd and 1st classes respectively.
