= Ministry for Naval Affairs (Greece) =

Government agency in Greece

Minister for Naval Affairs
- Υπουργός Ναυτικών (Greek)
- Nominator: Prime Minister
- Appointer: the King
- Precursor: Secretary of State for Naval Affairs
- Formation: 1846
- First holder: Dimitrios Voulgaris
- Final holder: Alexandros Koryzis
- Abolished: 1949
- Superseded by: Minister for National Defence

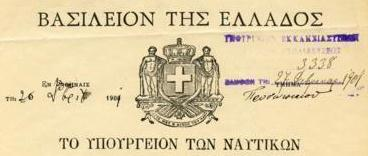
Letterhead of the Ministry for Naval Affairs in 1901

The Ministry for Naval Affairs (Greek: Ὑπουργείον [ἐπὶ] τῶν Ναυτικῶν) was a government department of Greece responsible for matters pertaining to the Greek Navy as well as the Greek Merchant Marine Ministry.

The Ministry for Naval Affairs was established during the early years of the modern Greek state, reflecting the country's long-standing maritime traditions and the importance of shipping and seafaring to its economy and society. Greece's strategic geographic position and its numerous islands made the maritime sector a key element of national life and policy.

== History ==
The ministry was established in January 1822, when the Provisional Administration of Greece was formed following the start of the Greek War of Independence, with the name Ministry for Naval Affairs (Μινιστέριον των Ναυτικών). After the reorganization of the government under Ioannis Kapodistrias, and in the early years of King Otto's rule, it was known as the Secretariat of State for Naval Affairs (Γραμματεία τῆς Ἐπικρατείας ἐπὶ τῶν Ναυτικῶν), but after 1843 it was renamed to its eventual name (Ὑπουργείον ἐπὶ τῶν Ναυτικῶν, later simplified Ὑπουργείον τῶν Ναυτικῶν).

In 1936, the merchant marine section was split off to form an independent Merchant Marine Ministry, and the Ministry for Naval Affairs retained only its military responsibilities. In 1950, the Nikolaos Plastiras government established the Ministry of National Defence, to which the Ministry for Naval Affairs was subordinated as a Sub-Ministry (Ὑφυπουργείον τῶν Ναυτικῶν) until 1953, when the Alexandros Papagos government abolished the position.

== Functions ==
The Ministry for Naval Affairs was responsible for a range of issues related to Greece's maritime and shipping industries. These included:

- Overseeing the Greek merchant navy and other commercial shipping operations, including personnel training, ship safety, and industry regulation.
- Ensuring adherence to international maritime laws and standards, including environmental protections and safety measures.
- Managing Greece's ports and harbors, including infrastructure development and maintenance.
- Promoting the Greek shipping industry domestically and internationally.
- Coordinating with other government departments on issues related to maritime security, environmental protection, and economic policy.
