= Hellenic Navy General Staff =

Γενικό Επιτελείο Ναυτικού Hellenic Navy General Staff
- Seal of the Hellenic Navy
- Active: 1907–1941; 1944–present
- Country: Greece
- Allegiance: Hellenic Navy
- Branch: Active duty
- Type: Staff
- Part of: Ministry of National Defence
- Garrison/HQ: Athens

Commanders
- Chief: VADM Stylianos Petrakis

The Hellenic Navy General Staff (Greek: Γενικό Επιτελείο Ναυτικού, abbr. ΓΕΝ) is the general staff of the Hellenic Navy, the naval component of the Greek Armed Forces. It is headed by the Chief of the Navy General Staff, currently Vice Admiral Stylianos Petrakis.

== History ==
The Hellenic Navy General Staff was established by law on 21 July 1907 and organized by Royal Decree on 12 November of the same year. It ceased to function following the German invasion of Greece in April 1941, and was reconstituted following Liberation in September 1944. During the intervening period, the Royal Hellenic Navy, although run by the Greek government in exile, was subordinated operationally to the British Admiralty. When the Hellenic National Defence General Staff was established in 1950, the HNGS was subordinated to it. During the Cold War, the Chief of the HNGS also fulfilled the duties of NATO Commander Eastern Mediterranean (COMEDEAST).

== Command Structure ==
- Chief of the Navy General Staff (Αρχηγός ΓΕΝ, Α/ΓΕΝ), the head of the Navy
- Deputy Chief of the Navy General Staff (Υπαρχηγός ΓΕΝ), who functions as the chief of staff and runs its day-to-day affairs
- General Inspector of the Navy (Γενικός Επιθεωρητής ΠΝ), subordinated directly to the Chief of the HNGS
- Director of Financial Inspection of the Navy (Διευθυντής Οικονομικού Ελέγχου ΠΝ)
