= Mississippi-class battleship =

Class of American pre-dreadnoughts

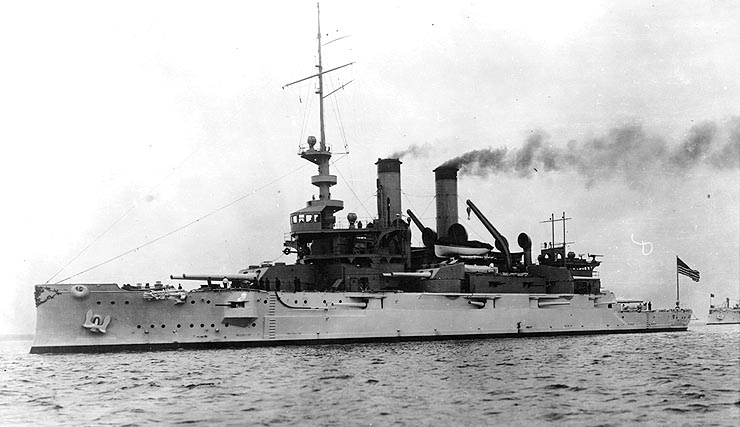
- USS Mississippi

Class overview
- Name: Mississippi class
- Builders: William Cramp & Sons
- Operators: United States Navy; Hellenic Navy
- Preceded by: Connecticut class
- Succeeded by: South Carolina class
- In commission: 1908–1914 (US Navy); 1914–1941 (Hellenic Navy)
- Planned: 2
- Completed: 2
- Lost: 2

General characteristics
- Type: Pre-dreadnought battleship
- Displacement: 13,000 long tons (13,209 t)
- Length: 382 ft (116.4 m)
- Beam: 77 ft (23.5 m)
- Draft: 24 ft 7 in (7.5 m)
- Installed power: 8 × Babcock & Wilcox boilers; 10,000 shp (7,500 kW)
- Propulsion: 2 × screws; 2 × triple-expansion steam engines
- Speed: 17 kn (31 km/h; 20 mph)
- Complement: 744 officers and men
- Armament: 4 × 12 in (305 mm)/45 caliber Mark 5 guns (2×2); 8 × 8 in (203 mm)/45 cal Mark 6 guns (4×2); 8 × 7 in (178 mm)/45 cal Mark 2 guns (8×1); 12 × 3 in (76 mm)/50 cal guns (12×1); 6 × 3-pounders; 2 × 21 in (533 mm) torpedo tubes

The Mississippi class of battleships comprised two ships which were authorized in the 1903 naval budget: Mississippi and Idaho; these were named for the 20th and 43rd states, respectively. These were the last pre-dreadnought battleships to be designed for the United States Navy, but not the last to be built, because one more ship of a prior design was completed later under the 1904 naval budget. While the quality and technology of the weaponry and armor were first-rate, these ships included a variety of main, intermediate, secondary, and tertiary gun sizes in a predreadnought configuration which became obsolete before the ships were completed.

The first several years of the 20th century were a period of confusion and transition in US naval strategy, tactics, and ship design. The Mississippi class, along with the preceding Connecticut class, were designed based on lessons learned in the Spanish–American War, but while they were under construction, the Russo-Japanese War, war games, and experimentation demonstrated new priorities and concepts which would influence future designs. This was also a period where rapid development of techniques and training in the use of large guns made the inclusion of rapid-fire intermediate and secondary weapons unnecessary. Future US designs would reduce the confusing array of guns sizes in predreadnought battleships and rely on one gun size for the main armament, the "all-big-gun" concept, along with many small guns of a uniform caliber to combat small vessels in close proximity.

The Mississippi-class ships were smaller than the several preceding classes of US battleships. They were designed in an attempt to reduce the rapid growth in the size and cost of U.S. battleships. Also, a theory existed among influential naval leaders, including Dewey and Mahan, that many small battleships could be strategically useful, as were small ships of the line in the 18th and 19th centuries. In essence, the Mississippi-class ships were smaller versions of the preceding Connecticut class with virtually the same armament and armor, but the reduction in length, engine size, and fuel capacity caused them to be slow and short-ranged. Other design compromises caused them to perform poorly in terms of steering, stability, and sea keeping.

These ships served in the US Navy from 1908 to 1914, when they were sold to Greece. Most US service was with the Atlantic Fleet, though these ships did not perform well in fleet operations due to their lower speeds and shorter ranges. The ships were frequently detached for special tasks, including goodwill tours, and Mississippi was used for a time as a seaplane support vessel. Both ships took part in US military interventions in Mexico and the Caribbean, including landing Marines and supporting early air operations.

In 1914, both Mississippi-class ships were sold to Greece, being renamed Kilkis and Lemnos; this was the only sale of functional US battleships to a foreign government. From 1914 to the early 1930s, the ships were active in the Greek Navy, serving mostly in coastal defense and attack roles. In these missions and in the calmer waters of the Mediterranean, their limitations were less pronounced. They served in the Russian Civil War and the Greco-Turkish War. By the mid-1930s, they were relegated to reserve and auxiliary roles, and Lemnos (ex-Idaho) had her guns removed to bolster coastal fortifications. Both were sunk by German aircraft in 1941, and raised in the 1950s to be sold for scrap.

== Purpose ==
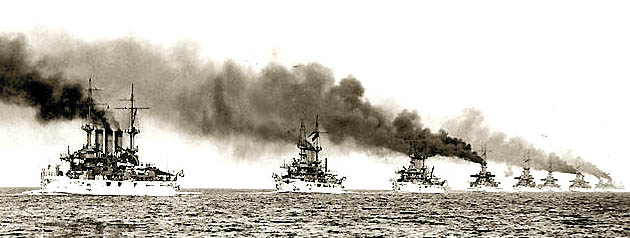
The Great White Fleet demonstrated America's new naval strength by sailing around the world. Most of these ships were under 10 years old, but were already obsolete.

In the early 20th century, the US Navy was growing rapidly. The Navy commissioned its first battleships in 1895, and by the middle of the next decade, Jane's Fighting Ships ranked its battle line second only to the British Navy. However, this rapid growth was not universally supported either within the government or within the Navy. Compromises between powerful groups were frequently necessary to get funding.

The Mississippi-class ships were designed to meet Congressional and Navy Department objectives of reducing the escalating cost of new battleships, the quantity, size, and cost of which had increased dramatically over the first two decades of US battleship production. (Note: Preliminary plans for the first two US battleships were completed in 1885. Construction was approved in 1886, and the first keel was laid down in 1888. However, technical difficulties, particularly with armor, delayed completion, and neither was commissioned until 1895. By the time these were commissioned, they were obsolete, as newer, larger designs were being completed. By the end of fiscal 1902, 10 battleships and two second-class battleships had been commissioned, with seven more battleships authorized but not completed. The per-ship cost had doubled from the $4 million range for the Illinois class in the 1896 budget to nearly $8 million for Connecticut in the 1902 budget. The Mississippi-class ships would cost just under $6 million each.) A division occurred among US naval planners in the early years of the 20th century over whether to have technically superior ships or many less expensive ones, with President Theodore Roosevelt among those supporting the former and Admiral of the Navy George Dewey along with Captain Alfred Thayer Mahan supporting the latter approach. The 1903 naval budget effected a compromise by calling for five ships: three more ships of the 16,000 long tons (16,257 t) Connecticut class and two ships of a new less expensive class of about 13,000 long tons (13,209 t), with the design still to be determined.

The ships that became the Mississippi class were intended to serve as the modern equivalent of 19th-century third-rate ship of the line, offering what was thought to be an efficient compromise between sailing ability (speed, handling), fire power, and cost. This concept had formed the backbone of the sailing battle fleets of the previous century, but trends in early 20th century naval strategies were making the third-rate concept obsolete. Prevailing strategies called for a consistent battle line of first-rate units.

== Design ==
The Mississippi-class battleships were the last predreadnought US battleship class to be designed; however, New Hampshire, the last ship of the prior Connecticut-class design, was authorized and completed after these ships; therefore, it was the last US predreadnought ship to be built.

While Congress had authorized three vessels in the 13,000-long ton range, the design was not specified in the 1903 naval budget. Three approaches were initially considered: a scaled-down version of the preceding 16,000-long ton Connecticut class, five of which had been approved with the 1902 and 1903 budgets; a scaled-up version of the 12,500 long tons (12,701 t) Maine class, an 1898 design, three of which were commissioned from 1902 to 1904; and a completely new design which might incorporate new ideas and technology. Interesting adaptations were considered for new designs, (Note: The chief constructor considered two radical options: Combine battleship armor and secondary batteries, but reduce the size of the four guns in the primary battery to 10-inch (254 mm) guns, similar to a large armored cruiser such as USS Tennessee; or reduce the size of the guns in the main battery to 10-inches, but increase the number to 12 guns, and eliminate the 8-inch (203 mm) and 7-inch (178 mm) secondary batteries (the all-big-gun concept). Either of these options would have saved weight and allowed for larger engines and an increase in speed.) and weight-saving technology could allow increased efficiencies to be achieved from the older Maine class design, (Note: Scaling up from Maine would have included replacing the 6-inch (152 mm) rapid fire guns in casemates with 7-inch (178 mm) rapid fire gins in the same mountings. Hull depth would have increased to accommodate the 7-inch guns and armor would have been increased to standards consistent with the Connecticut class, including the use of lighter Krupp armor and superior coverage.) which was closest to the weight goal.

As with most US naval designs, coal storage and engine efficiency were more important than in European designs. US ships might have to fight far from their home shores, especially in the Pacific. Even in the Caribbean, US forces might be farther from their coaling stations than a European power with colonial bases. Draft was a concern, since southern US harbors tended to have shallow entrances, and some proponents felt that all ships should be able to egress all major harbors. Beams were typically limited by the width of dry docks.

=== Armament ===
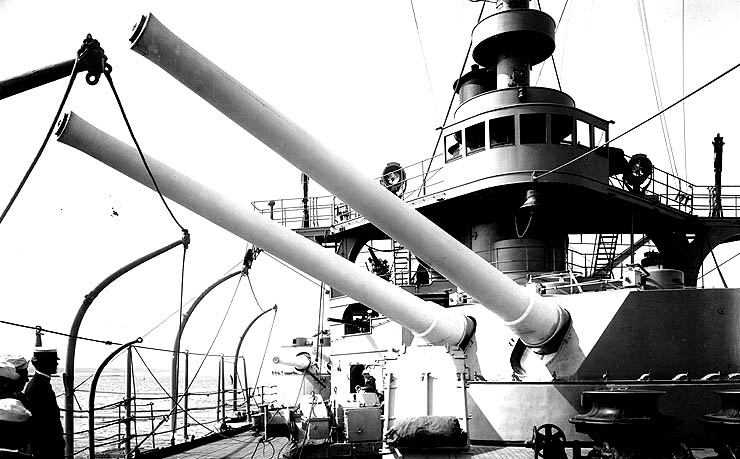
USS Mississippi – 12-inch (300 mm) main battery

In 1903, differing concepts of the ultimate combination of guns were available, with many ideas based on various experiences and interpretations from recent naval battles, war games, and other experimentation. Recent US battleship designs had included primary guns, intermediate guns, secondary guns, and tertiary guns, which were typical in the predreadnought configuration. In 1890, the US Navy had pioneered the use of 8-inch (203 mm) intermediate guns with the Indiana class, but had not used these consistently in their previous designs because opinions and experiences varied.

The quality of guns, armor, ordnance, and design was changing rapidly, so experience could quickly become irrelevant. Combat experience in the Spanish–American War had shown the value of many smaller guns at close range, where the larger guns had been inaccurate. (Note: In July 1898, based on analysis of naval battles during the Spanish–American War, a US Navy Board released these conclusions: "loaded torpedoes above the water line are a serious menace to the vessels carrying them..." and "The value of rapid fire (Also known as: quick fire or QF) batteries cannot be too highly estimated." As a result the 8-inch guns which had been very efficient in the battle of Santiago were reintroduced in the Virginia class. Above-water torpedo tubes were discontinued on US battleships and those on existing ships were removed.) In the Russo Japanese War of 1904–1905, just six years later, decisive effects were obtained at long ranges, well beyond the effective limits of 8-inch (200 mm) ordnance. However, by this point the designs were established for the Mississippi class and the keels had already been laid down.

==== Main batteries ====
Recent American designs had continued to include large primary batteries of either 12-inch (305 mm) or 13-inch (330 mm) guns, along with several intermediate 8-inch guns for faster fire in closer combat with armored vessels. The lighter intermediate guns were considered valuable for penetrating upper-level armor, where the heavy guns were more effective on the main belt and heavy turrets. The former were likely to diminish the fighting ability of the opponent, while the latter were more likely to sink her.

Earlier US battleships had used 13-inch guns with black powder propellant; the 1898 design of the Maine class used more powerful but smaller 12-inch guns using smokeless powder, giving a greater velocity and flatter trajectory. The 12-inch rifles available in 1904 had a range of 9,000 yd (8,200 m), about double the range of the black powder main armament used in the Spanish–American War. These were considered an excellent compromise between weight and firepower, since limitations in gunnery control made longer-range guns impractical. The contemporary consideration was not whether to go larger, but whether to go with more. In 1902, naval officers, with the backing of President Theodore Roosevelt, began to develop superior fire control techniques and equipment. The development of better spotting and range finders led to improvements in range capacity and accuracy. At the same time, superior training and systems significantly reduced the time required to load and fire the large guns, from three minutes to one minute.

Intermediate 8-inch guns had been discontinued in 1896 with the Illinois class, but based on experience in the Spanish–American War in 1898, 8-inch/45-caliber guns were reinstated in the Virginia class and continued in the Connecticut class. Typically, these were carried in two-gun turrets, but the placement of the turrets had been inconsistent in prior designs; in two prior designs, the turrets for the 8-inch guns were superimposed over the turrets for the 12/13-inch guns (see Virginia and Kearsarge classes). Some designers felt that 8-inch guns were redundant to the faster firing 7-inch/45-caliber guns carried in casemates. Others argued that increases in the rate of fire and accuracy of the 12-inch guns eliminated the need for any smaller guns in the main battery.

==== Secondary batteries ====
In 1903, secondary batteries were typically considered to be a combination of torpedo defense—defense against smaller boats armed with torpedoes, such as torpedo boats or destroyers—and weapons to attack the lightly armored upper structures of capital ships. (Note: This was a time of rapid change in the perceived purpose and tactics for capital ships; while the purpose of smaller weapons, sometimes called tertiary guns, was clearly to ward off and destroy torpedo boats and destroyers, mixed and unclear objectives existed for the larger secondary guns (see Note 6). As the effective range of the main armament increased, the effectiveness of the secondary batteries against capital ships diminished.)

Recent US warships had mounted a combination of a few 7-inch or 6-inch guns and many smaller guns in the 2-inch (51 mm) to 3-inch (76 mm) range (6-pounder to 12-pounder in the traditional terms). The larger of these guns were typically protected in casemates and the smaller ones open on the deck or in lightly protected casemates.

A fast-firing 7-inch/45-caliber gun had been adopted with the previous battleship class to replace earlier 6-inch guns; these brought a significant improvement in ballistics, expanding the potential beyond torpedo defense, but came with drawbacks. Various opinions on the best combination of guns existed: all 8-inch, all 7-inch, or a mix. (Note: In planning for the Connecticut class, the Board on Construction favored a ship on which 6-inch and 8-inch guns would all be replaced by newly designed 7-inch guns, which were the most powerful guns with shells that could be handled by one person. The 7-inch guns fired a much heavier shell than 6-inch guns of earlier classes, but were faster firing than the 8-inch guns. The shell for the 7-inch guns weighed 165 lb (75 kg), whereas a shell for the 6-inch gun weighed about 100 lb (45 kg), and the shell for the 8-inch gun weighed about 250 lb (110 kg). These shells could only be moved by machines or by several men, making the 7-inch "the largest [gun] capable of really rapid fire in the context of existing technology". In the end, only the 6-inch guns were replaced, and the 8-inch batteries remained. The 6-inch guns could be fired six times per minute, but the 7-inch required separate powder bags and could only be fired four times per minute. The guns had improved ballistic performance over the 6-inch, but there was a problem: The splashes of the 8- and 7-inch guns could not be distinguished at a distance. This confused the gunners, who would watch the splashes to gauge accuracy while trying to adjust their fire. The uniform intermediate battery proposed by the Board on Construction could have been more practical.) Though considered to be quick-firing, the propellant for 7-inch guns was loaded in bags, making them slower than contemporary 6-inch guns. The Navy considered these to be excellent for the intended role; however, in World War I North Atlantic convoy duty, the disadvantages in seakeeping outweighed the utility; they were removed from battleships remaining in US service in 1918.

Beginning with the Maine-class vessels, commissioned in 1902, the 3-inch (76 mm) 50-caliber gun (12-pounder) was used on most U.S. battleships as an antitorpedo-boat weapon. These and smaller weapons are frequently referred to as tertiary guns. This role was filled back to the earliest U.S. battleships, including the Texas and first Maine, by the 6-pounder 2.24-inch (57 mm). Most 3-in guns were removed from U.S. battleships before combat operations in World War I. (Note: During World War I, a desperate need existed to arm merchant ships; the 3-in 50-caliber guns were useful in that role. On 3 March 1917, the removal of 38 such guns from battleships and cruisers was authorized, and the removal of 304 more was authorized on 26–28 April 1917. The removal of these guns was determined to allow for the sealing of dangerous openings for a gain in military efficiency.)

==== Competing designs ====
The future of battleship weaponry was at a crossroads. Opinions varied among top naval leaders; some U.S. naval leaders were discussing the all-big-gun concept in parallel with the British HMS Dreadnought, while other designers felt that the torpedo would completely replace the gun, and battleships should become heavily armored launch platforms. Other proposals included even more but smaller primary guns, in the 11-inch (280 mm) size to save on weight. In 1903, analysis of war games had determined that one battleship with 12 11-inch or 12-inch guns, in a hexagonal turret placement, could be superior to three conventional battleships in individual actions. (Note: The June 1902 issue of Proceedings of the US Naval Institute contained comments by the U.S. Navy's leading gunnery expert Prof. P.R. Alger proposing a main battery of eight 12-in guns in twin turrets. In May 1902, the Bureau of Construction and Repair submitted a design for the battleship with 12 10-inch guns in twin turrets, two at the ends and four in the wings. Lt. Cdr. H. C. Poundstone submitted a paper to President Roosevelt in December 1902 arguing the case for larger battleships. In an appendix to his paper, Poundstone suggested a greater number of 11-inch and 9-inch guns was preferable to a smaller number of 12-inch and 9-inch guns. The Naval War College and Bureau of Construction and Repair developed these ideas in studies between 1903 and 1905. War game studies begun in July 1903 "showed that a battleship armed with 12 11-inch or 12-inch guns hexagonally arranged would be equal to three or more of the conventional type.") Other analysis suggested that in fleet actions, only broadsides were effective, thus maximizing the number of centerline guns was the most efficient approach. While neither approach was incorporated in the Mississippi class, the centerline maximum broadside concept was followed in all subsequent U.S. battleship designs.

==== Final design ====
In the end, these ships were built with main batteries identical to the Connecticut class, while reducing by four guns the secondary 7-inch battery, omitting eight of the tertiary 3-inch guns, and sacrificing two torpedo tubes. Subsequent designs would eliminate the 7-inch batteries completely, and most of the 3-inch guns were removed from other battleships before combat in World War I, so in this respect, the design did not suffer by comparing forward.

The main battery consisted of four 12-inch 45-caliber guns, meaning that the gun is 45 times as long as it is in diameter. These were considered quick-firing guns and were arranged in two twin turrets, one forward and one to the rear of the main superstructure. The eight 8-inch 45-caliber guns were arranged in four twin turrets outboard of the main superstructure on each side of the ship.

The remaining eight 7-inch 45-caliber guns were distributed four per side, in casemates on the side of the ship, below the main deck. (Note: Casemates are similar to turrets, but in the case of U.S. capital ships, only one gun is placed per casemate. In naval gunnery, a casemate is a vertical armor plate with openings for guns. It is less protected than a gun turret and allows for a smaller field of fire. It is much cheaper to build and far lighter in weight for a given level of armor protection. In late 19th- and early 20th-century battleships, casemates were used to mount secondary guns for defending the ship against torpedo boats. In practice, these guns were generally quite useless; usually mounted close to the water, casemate guns were often awash in spray, and were sometimes swamped completely by the ship's rolling. More modern designs did away with casemate weapons entirely, favoring extra topside mounts for their secondary batteries.) Four 3-inch (76 mm) 50-caliber guns were mounted in the upper casemates (on the main deck), two per side, behind 2-inch (51 mm) of armor plate. Another two, one per side, were mounted in blister casemates on the gun deck, near the bow. The remaining eight guns were on open mounts on the upper deck, the bridge, and other deck spaces. Two submerged torpedo tubes were fitted on the broadside, near the bow of the ships. Each ship carried a total of 13 torpedoes.

=== Armor ===
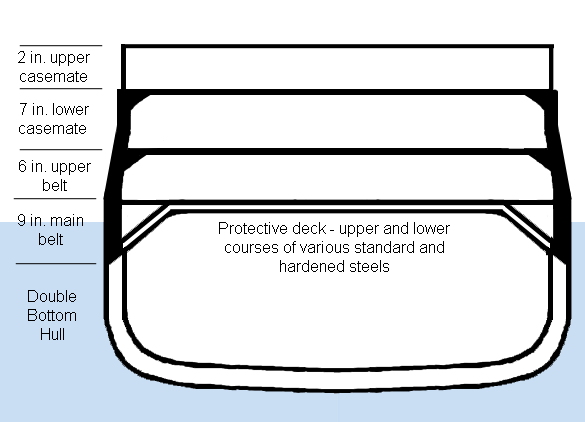
Simplified drawing of armor scheme for early 20th century U.S. battleships

Prior to the mid 1870s, armor was made of wrought iron plate, sometime backed with wood. In the 1870s, compound armor was developed, where a hardened steel face was cemented to a softer iron backing, which prevented cracking. During the late 1880s, nickel-steel armor was devised and in 1890, the Harvey process was developed, where a nickel-steel plate was treated with carbon and hardened in cold water. This process allowed one homogeneous steel plate to have both a hard surface and a softer back which was less likely to crack. During the 1890s, Krupp armor further refined the Harvey process by including additional metals in the alloy and developing a system where the hardening process penetrated more deeply into the plates. Tests showed that 5.75-inch (146 mm) of Krupp armor was equal to 7.75-inch (197 mm) of Harvey armor, 12-inch (300 mm) of compound armor, and 12-inch (300 mm) of wrought iron plate, while in thinner plates, Harvey armor was basically equal to Krupp.

The Mississippi-class ships used a combination of Harvey- and Krupp-style armor (American-made), with much of the side armor backed with teak wood, consistent with other U.S. capital ships of the decade. The amount of armor and its strength was consistent with the preceding Connecticut class and in some cases was more complete in coverage and was thicker, especially compared to the earliest ships in that series. The belt armor was thinner, 9 in (230 mm) compared to 11 in (280 mm), but longer, 244 ft (74 m) compared to 200 ft (61 m), despite the Mississippi class being shorter, 382 ft (116 m) compared to 456 ft (139 m). The primary turret armor was thicker by an inch—12 in (300 mm) thick—as opposed to 11 in (280 mm) on the USS Connecticut.

=== Machinery ===
A triple-expansion engine uses steam three times.

When these ships were designed, the older technology of reciprocating steam engines was slowly being replaced by the newer technology of steam turbine propulsion. While turbines generally meant more speed, they were less fuel-efficient and limited the range of the ships unless more fuel could be stored. Early Dreadnought designs, which were in simultaneous development with the Mississippi class, used primitive direct-drive turbines. The U.S. Navy was slow to fully adopt turbines, and only used them exclusively in battleship production when indirect transmissions became refined (gear reduction or turbo-electric). Several subsequent battleship classes were built where otherwise identical vessels had different types of engines (for example, the Delaware and Nevada classes).

Mississippi and Idaho were equipped with two-shaft vertical triple-expansion steam engines, which drove two propellers. These were reciprocating engines where the steam was used multiple times (triple expansion) for greater efficiency. Steam was provided by eight Babcock & Wilcox boilers. Their engines were rated at 10,000 indicated horsepower (7,500 kW), which produced a top speed of 17 knots (31 km/h; 20 mph). On trials, Mississippi reached 13,607 ihp (10,147 kW) and a maximum speed of 17.11 kn (31.69 km/h; 19.69 mph). In terms of speed, this class of ships was inferior to several preceding classes, and was only slightly superior to the Illinois class which was laid down in 1896.

The ships carried 600 long tons (610 t) of coal in purpose-designed coal bunkers and up to another 1,200 long tons (1,200 t) of coal could be stored in voids in the sides of the hull. This provided the ships with a range of 5,800 nautical miles (10,700 km; 6,700 mi) at a cruising speed of 10 kn (19 km/h; 12 mph). The range was less than the previous class.

=== General characteristics ===
Plan and profile drawing of the Mississippi class

The final design was a scaled-down version of the preceding Connecticut class. By comparison, these ships were a knot slower and had a lower freeboard, so they did not perform as well in heavy seas. The two Mississippi-class ships were 382 ft (116 m) long overall, had a beam of 77 ft (23 m) and a draft of 24 ft 8 in (7.52 m). The ships were designed to displace 13,000 long tons (13,209 t) at normal displacement and up to 14,465 long tons (14,697 t) at full combat load. Each ship had a crew of 34 officers and 710 enlisted men.

The World Cruise of 1907–1909 tested the seakeeping of the U.S. designs. Even the earlier designs, including the Connecticut class with their higher freeboard, carried their secondary armament too close to the waterline. The ships initially carried a pole mast above the conning tower, though shortly after commissioning, both ships had lattice masts added aft, and in 1910, the forward masts were also replaced with lattice masts.

The reduced length while retaining the same beam as the prior Connecticut class resulted in a disadvantageous length-to-beam ratio, causing reduced performance relative to that class. Not only was their top speed a knot slower, but also their economical speed was reduced by one and half knots. They also had 25% less coal storage, further reducing their operating range.

The Mississippi ships had poor seakeeping qualities, making them poor gunnery platforms underway in Atlantic waters. Their motion was irregular, and their low length-to-beam ratio caused excessive rolling and pitching, which made it difficult to keep the guns on target. The reduced length, significantly cut away from the aft, made it difficult to keep the ships on a consistent course, even in smoother waters.

== Ships in class ==
Construction data
Name	Hull no.	Builder	Laid down	Launched	Commissioned	Fate
Mississippi	BB-23	William Cramp & Sons	12 May 1904	30 Sep 1905	1 Feb 1908	Sold to Greece, 1914; sunk by German aircraft, Apr 1941; sold for scrap, 1950s
Idaho	BB-24	William Cramp & Sons	12 May 1904	9 Dec 1905	1 Apr 1908	Sold to Greece, 1914; sunk by German aircraft, Apr 1941; sold for scrap, 1950s

=== USS Mississippi (BB-23) ===
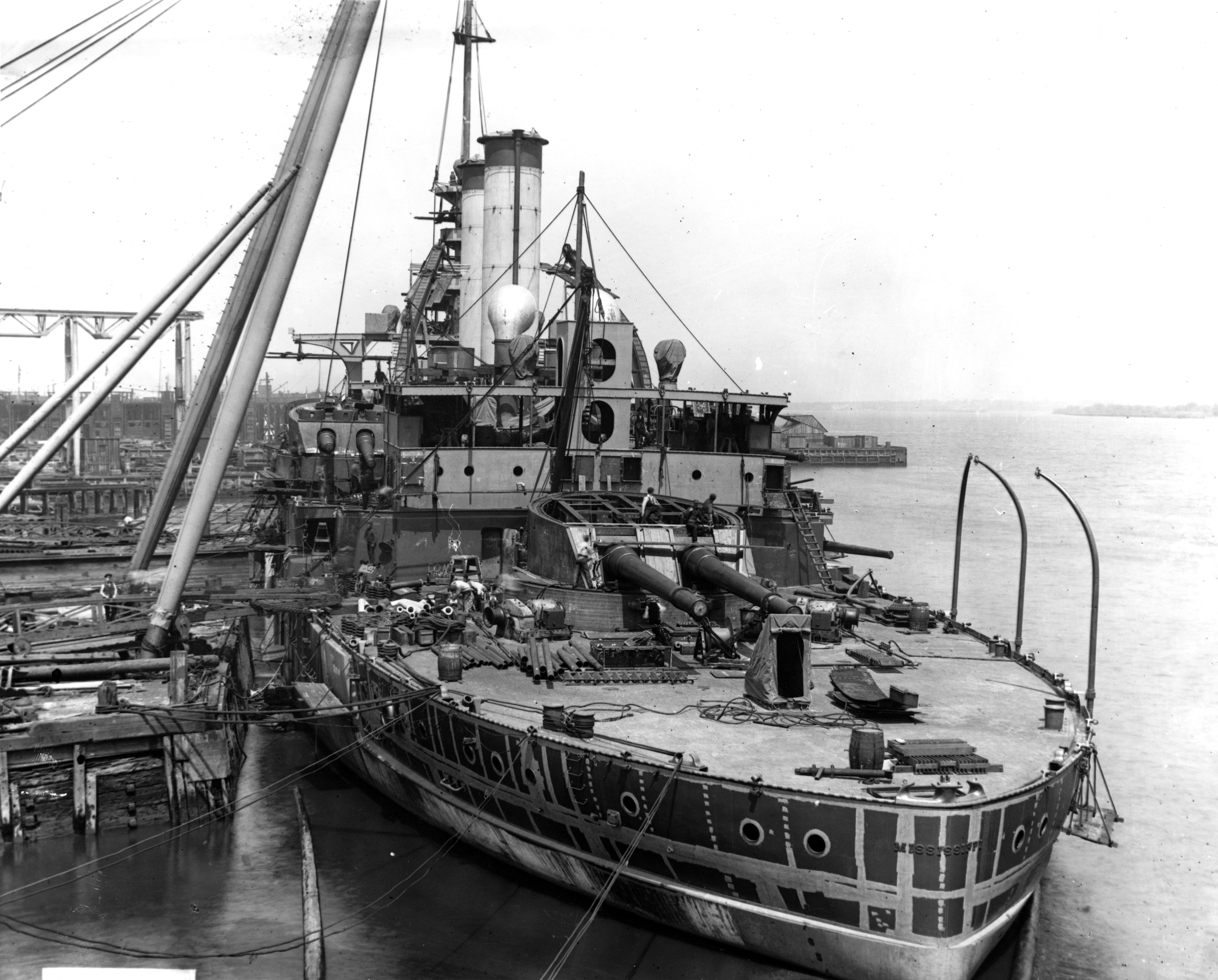
USS Mississippi under construction, in 1907

The second Mississippi (Battleship No. 23) was laid down in 1904, launched in 1905, and commissioned in early 1908, She was given a shakedown cruise off the coast of Cuba in 1908, then returned to Philadelphia for final fitting out.

In early 1909, she attended the inauguration of the President of Cuba, met the Great White Fleet upon its return, and was reviewed by the President. For the remainder of the year and into 1910, she traveled the waters off New England, the Caribbean, and the Gulf of Mexico, took a voyage up the Mississippi River, and participated in war games out of Guantanamo Bay.

In late 1910, she sailed to Europe as part of Atlantic Fleet maneuvers, following which she spent about 14 months off the Atlantic coast, based alternately in Philadelphia and Norfolk, serving as a training ship and conducting operational exercises. In June 1912, she landed a Marine detachment at El Cuero, Cuba, to protect American interests. Following exercises with the fleet, she returned to Philadelphia Navy Yard, where she was put in the First Reserve in August 1912.

In late 1913, she was assigned duty as an aeronautic station ship at Pensacola, Florida. With the outbreak of fighting in Mexico in April 1914, Mississippi sailed to Veracruz, arriving with the first detachment of naval aviators to go into combat. In June 1914 she returned to Hampton Roads, where in July she was decommissioned and transferred to the Greek Navy.

=== USS Idaho (BB-24) ===
The second Idaho (Battleship No. 24) was laid down in 1904, launched in 1905, and commissioned in mid-1908. She was given shakedown cruise off the coast of Cuba in 1908, then returned to Philadelphia for final fitting out and repairs.

In the summer of 1908, she transported a detachment of marines to Colon in the Canal Zone to support a peaceful election process.

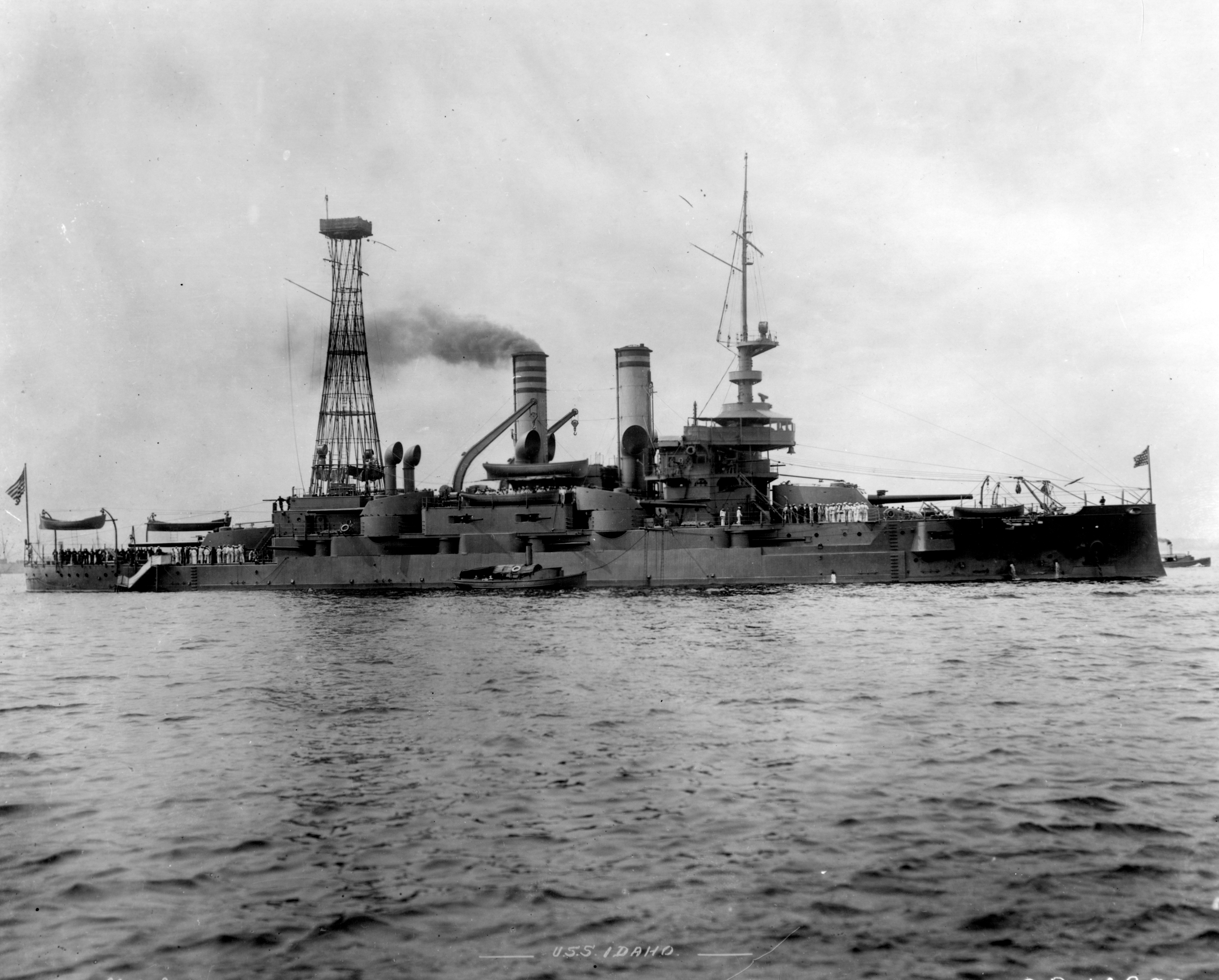
USS Idaho with first cage mast as installed in 1908

In early 1909, she met the Great White Fleet upon its return to the U.S. and was reviewed by the President. For the remainder of the year and into 1910, she alternated between the waters off New England and southern waters, including the Caribbean and the Gulf of Mexico, along with a voyage in the Mississippi River and war games out of Guantanamo Bay.

In late 1910, she sailed across the Atlantic with the Third Division of the Atlantic Fleet to Gravesend Bay, England, and then to Brest, France, returning to Guantanamo Bay in early 1911.

After routine service with the Atlantic Fleet and in Cuban waters, Idaho toured Gulf of Mexico and the Mississippi River in 1911, visiting many ports on the Mississippi River.

In February 1913, unrest in Mexico led to a coup d'état and the death of deposed President Francisco I. Madero. For the protection of American interests, Idaho deployed to Tampico in May and to Veracruz in June. Upon returning, she was placed in the Atlantic Reserve Fleet on 27 October 1913.

Idaho remained in reserve until recommissioned at Philadelphia in March 1914. In mid-year, she steamed to the Mediterranean with a group of midshipmen on board. After visiting several ports, she arrived at the French port of Villefranche on 17 July 1914. There, she was formally transferred to the Greek Navy on 30 July 1914.

=== Greek service ===
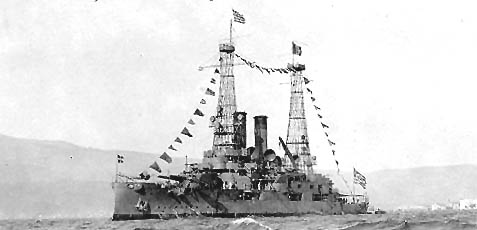
Lemnos flying Greek flags

Diplomatic tensions between Greece and the Ottoman Empire following the 1912–13 Balkan Wars resulted in each seeking to buy powerful warships abroad that would enable them to control the Aegean Sea. Idaho and Mississippi were sold on 8 July 1914, to Fred J. Gauntlett, an intermediary, who in turn sold them to the Greek government. The proceeds of the sale were used to increase the budget for the 1915 fiscal year, funding the building of a third New Mexico-class super-dreadnought, Idaho (BB-42).

Mississippi was renamed Kilkis for the crucial battle of the Second Balkan War, while Idaho became Lemnos in honor of a victorious naval battle over the Turkish Navy during the First Balkan War. Though their service was uneventful, these ships served to balance German capital ships which were acquired by rival Turkey. (Note: The Greek naval evolution was a result of turbulent times and mixed alliances, even in advance of World War I, including naval competition and a historic rivalry with Turkey, against whom Greece had fought the Greco-Turkish War (1897) and the First Balkan War. While the development of capital ships was in the best interest of the Greeks vis-a-vis their enmity with Turkey, this also posed a threat to Britain, France, and Russia (the Entente) should Greece develop closer ties to Germany. British influence within the Greek Navy was strong, but the King was married to the Kaiser's sister; thus, before the war, Germany was also supportive of the Greek Navy. The strategic position of Greek ports and repair facilities made these at least as important as the Greek fleet, if not more so.) The design limitations and poor seakeeping tendencies were not as critical in that strategic environment and the calmer seas of the Mediterranean. U.S. Ambassador to Turkey Henry Morgenthau, Sr. wrote, "Those battleships immediately took their places as the most powerful vessels of the Greek Navy, and the enthusiasm of the Greeks in obtaining them was unbounded."

==== World War I ====
In 1916, a serious division in the Greek government developed between King Constantine I and Prime Minister Eleftherios Venizelos over whether Greece should enter World War I. This became known as the "National Schism", where separate governments emerged. (Note: There was division in the Greek government which involved the disagreement between King Constantine I and Prime Minister Eleftherios Venizelos over whether Greece should enter World War I. This became known as the National Schism. The disagreement and the subsequent dismissal of Venizelos by the King resulted in Greece becoming divided in two radically opposed political camps when Venizelos set up a separate state in Northern Greece and eventually, with Allied support, forced the King to abdicate.) Defections by units of the Greek Navy to the Venizelist factions provoked a Royalist purge of Venizelist officers and men from the Greek Navy. French Admiral Fournet, the Commander in Chief of the Allied Squadron, perceived the Greek fleet as a menace to the Entente powers in the Aegean. He delivered an ultimatum to the Greeks to sequester the small ships and disable the large ones. On 19 October 1916, the breech blocks, munitions, and torpedoes were removed from Lemnos and Kilkis. At the same time, the crews were reduced to one-third of normal size.

In June 1917, Greece was reunified under Venizelos and declared war against the Central Powers. Restoration of the Greek Navy was slow due to British and French disagreements and the difficulty in guaranteeing the officers and crews would support a war against the Central Powers. When France returned the ships, Lemnos and Kilkis took part in Allied operations in the Aegean. The greatest Allied need in the Mediterranean was for antisubmarine units, thus battleships were not a priority. (Note: After the failure of the Allied Dardanelles campaign, little need existed for capital ships in the Mediterranean beyond those needed to bottle up the Turkish and other fleets of the Central Powers, and those assets were adequate in 1917. The main threat was German submarine warfare: Conditions in the Mediterranean were ideal for submarine operations. The smaller Greek ships were most valuable for combating this threat, and capital ships were the most vulnerable. Even during the war, frictions occurred between Britain and France over Mediterranean priorities and the Greek naval assets. When Britain took over influence of Greek bases and ships toward the end of the war, they found that the French had depleted stores and exhausted the light fleet. Greece was not in a financial position to develop the navy and British funding was directed toward British priorities.)

After World War I, both ships saw action in 1919 under the command of Rear Admiral G. Kakoulidis, RHN, when the Greek Navy took part in the Allied expedition in support of Denikin's White Armies in Ukraine.

==== Later careers ====
The ships were also active in the operations of the Greco-Turkish War in Asia Minor from 1919 to 1922. As the Greeks had been on the winning side in World War I and the Ottoman Empire was one of the defeated powers, the Greeks were awarded large areas of mixed Turkish and Greek populations on the Asian coast of the Aegean Sea. On 15 May 1919, 20,000 Greek soldiers landed in Smyrna and took control of the city and its surroundings under cover of the Greek, French, and British navies. Lemnos was the flagship to the Second Fleet, based in Smyrna, under Rear Admiral G. Kalamidas; her mission was surveillance of the Black Sea, Dardanelles, and Asia Minor coasts. Over time, France and Italy became supportive of the emerging Turkish republic. Britain remained supportive of Greece, but opposed Greek moves against Istanbul in 1922. With waning support, the Greek army was defeated, and Greece was driven out of Asia by the Turks in late 1922, resulting in years of political and economic turmoil.

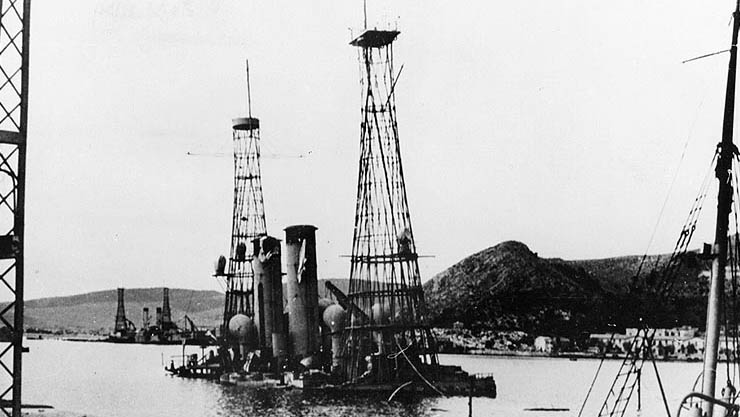
Kilkis sunk in foreground with Lemnos in background

Both battleships were relegated to reserve and auxiliary roles in the mid-1930s. Kilkis, which had been upgraded in the mid-1920s, became a naval artillery training facility in 1932. Lemnos's guns were removed and installed in a coastal defense battery on the island of Aegina. While they were both anchored in the Salamis Naval Base on 23 April 1941, both ships were sunk during the German invasion of Greece by Junkers Ju 87 Stuka dive bombers. Kilkis was hit by bombs and went down in shallow water at her moorings; Lemnos was also hit, but was able to get underway enough to be beached. The wrecks were refloated and sold for scrap in the 1950s.

== Bibliography ==
- Alden, John D. (2008). American Steel Navy: A Photographic History of the U.S. Navy from the Introduction of the Steel Hull in 1883 to the Cruise of the Great White Fleet. Annapolis: Naval Institute Press. ISBN 978-087021-248-2.
- Bellou, Fotini; Couloumbis, Theodore, eds. (2003). Greece in the Twentieth Century. London: Frank Cass Publishers. ISBN 071465-407-8.
- Cressman, Robert J. (10 August 2015). "Idaho II (Battleship No. 24)". Dictionary of American Naval Fighting Ships. Naval History & Heritage Command.
- Cressman, Robert J. (10 August 2015). "Mississippi II (Battleship No. 23)". Dictionary of American Naval Fighting Ships. Naval History & Heritage Command.
- Fotakis, Zisis (2005). 'Greek Naval Strategy and Policy, 1910–1919. London: Taylor & Francis, Inc. ISBN 978041535-014-3. viewable online
- Friedman, Norman (1985). U.S. Battleships: An Illustrated Design History. Annapolis: Naval Institute Press. ISBN 087021-715-1. (viewable online)
- Friedman, Norman (2008). Naval Firepower: Battleship Guns and Gunnery in the Dreadnought Era. Annapolis: Naval Institute Press. ISBN 978159114-555-4. viewable online
- Gardiner, Robert; Chesneau, Roger, eds. (1980). Conway's All the World's Fighting Ships 1922–1946. Annapolis: Naval Institute Press. ISBN 0870-2-1913-8.
- Gardiner, Robert; Gray, Randal, eds. (1985). Conway's All the World's Fighting Ships 1906–1921. Annapolis: Naval Institute Press. ISBN 0870219073. viewable online
- Gardiner, Robert; Lambert, Andrew (2001). Steam, Steel and Shellfire: The Steam Warship, 1815–1905. London: Conways. ISBN 078-581-413-2.
- Hore, Peter (2006). Battleships of World War I. London: Southwater Books. ISBN 978-184476-377-1.
- Hore, Peter (2007). Battleships. London: Anness Publishing Ltd. ISBN 978-075481-407-8.
- Hovgaard, William (1920). Modern History of Warships. London: Conway Maritime Press. ISBN 978-087021-849-1. viewable online
- Kinross, Patrick (1964). Atatürk, the rebirth of a nation. London: Weidenfeld and Nicolson. ISBN 978-184212-599-1.
- Koliopoulos, John S.; Veremis, Thanos M. (2010). Modern Greece: A History Since 1821. Oxford: Wiley, John & Sons. ISBN 978-140518-681-0.
- Paizis-Paradellis, Vice Admiral C., HN (2002). Hellenic Warships 1829–2001 (3rd ed.). Athens, Greece: The Society for the study of Greek History. ISBN 960-8172-14-4.
- Reilly, John C. Jr.; Scheina, Robert L. (1980). American Battleships 1886–1923. Maryland: Naval Institute Press. ISBN 087-021-524-8.
- Rose, Lisle A. (2007). Power at Sea The Age of Navalism, 1890–1918. Columbia, Missouri: University of Missouri Press. ISBN 978-008-262-168-3. (viewable online)
- Sondhaus, Lawrence (2001). Naval Warfare 1815–1914. London: Routledge. ISBN 0415-21-478-5.(viewable online)
- U.S. Navy Department, Bureau of Ordnance (1920). Navy Ordnance Activities, World War, 1917–1918. Washington: Government Printing Office (GPO). (viewable online)
