= Ouranos-class tanker =

Class overview
- Name: Ouranos
- Builders: Salamis shipyards, Kynosoura
- Operators: Hellenic Navy
- In commission: 1977–present
- Planned: 2
- Completed: 2
- Active: 2

General characteristics
- Type: Coastal tanker
- Displacement: 2,100 tons full load
- Length: 67.7 m (222 ft 1 in)
- Beam: 10 m (32 ft 10 in)
- Draught: 4.7 m (15 ft 5 in)
- Propulsion: 1 MWM-Burmeister & Wain 12V 20 diesel engine; 1,300 kW (1,750 hp)
- Speed: 12 knots (22 km/h; 14 mph)
- Complement: 28
- Armament: 2 × Oerlikon 20 mm guns

The Ouranos class is a ship class of two coastal tankers used by the Hellenic Navy. The ships are almost identical in size. They were built in 1975–1977 and they were commissioned into the Hellenic Navy in 1977. Their main task is to supply other ships and naval bases of the Hellenic Navy with fuel (Diesel F-76 and JP-5/JP-8) and drinking water.

== Ships ==
Pennant No.	Ship	Namesake	Builder	Commissioned	Status
A 416	Ouranos Ουρανός	Uranus	Salamis shipyards	27 January 1977	In service
A 417	Hyperion Υπερίων	Hyperion	Salamis shipyards	27 February 1977	In service
