= List of battleships of Greece =

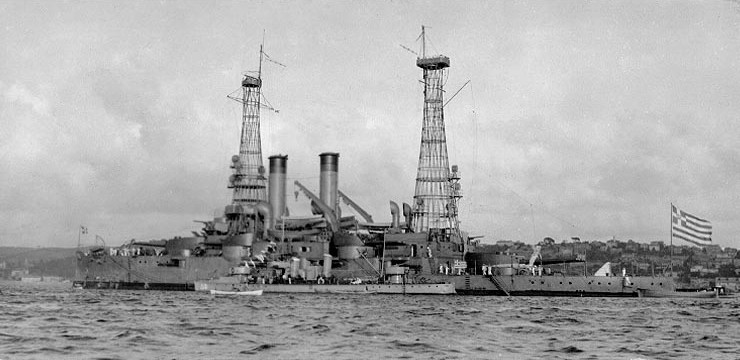
Lemnos in Constantinople in 1919

In the early 20th century, the Greek Navy embarked on an expansion program to counter a strengthening of Greece's traditional rival, the Ottoman Empire. (Note: The Greek Navy had previously built a series of ironclad capital ships, including Vasilissa Olga and Vasilefs Georgios, both built in the late 1860s, and the three Hydra-class ships, built in the late 1880s and early 1890s.) The Ottomans ordered a new dreadnought battleship, Reşadiye; in response, Greece ordered the dreadnought Salamis from a German shipyard. The Ottomans acquired the ex-Brazilian Rio de Janeiro and renamed her Sultân Osmân-ı Evvel. Greece responded with a second battleship ordered in France, Vasilefs Konstantinos, built to the same design as the French Bretagne class, with minor additions. As the Ottomans had a significant head start in battleship construction, the Greek Navy purchased two obsolete American pre-dreadnoughts—USS Mississippi and Idaho—as a stop-gap measure in June 1914. The ships were renamed Kilkis and Lemnos, respectively.

Greek naval plans were interrupted by the outbreak of World War I in August 1914, however. Work halted on Vasilefs Konstantinos in August and on Salamis in December 1914. As a result, Kilkis and Lemnos were the only battleships delivered to Greece. Greece remained neutral for the first three years of World War I, though in October 1916, France seized the Greek Navy and disarmed both of the battleships. They remained inactive for the rest of the war. Both ships saw service in 1919–1922 during the Greco–Turkish War. They continued to serve with the fleet until the early 1930s, when they were reduced to secondary roles. Lemnos became a barracks ship while Kilkis became a training ship. During the German invasion of Greece in April 1941, both ships were attacked and sunk in Salamis by Ju 87 Stuka dive-bombers. The two old battleships were scrapped after the end of the war. (Note: The Georgios Averof is sometimes mistakenly referred to as a battleship, but it is actually an armored cruiser.)

== Key ==
| Armament | The number and type of the primary armament |
| Armor | The maximum thickness of the armored belt |
| Displacement | Ship displacement at full combat load |
| Propulsion | Number of shafts, type of propulsion system, and top speed/horsepower generated |
| Service | The dates work began and finished on the ship and its ultimate fate |
| Laid down | The date the keel began to be assembled |
| Commissioned | The date the ship was commissioned |

== Salamis ==
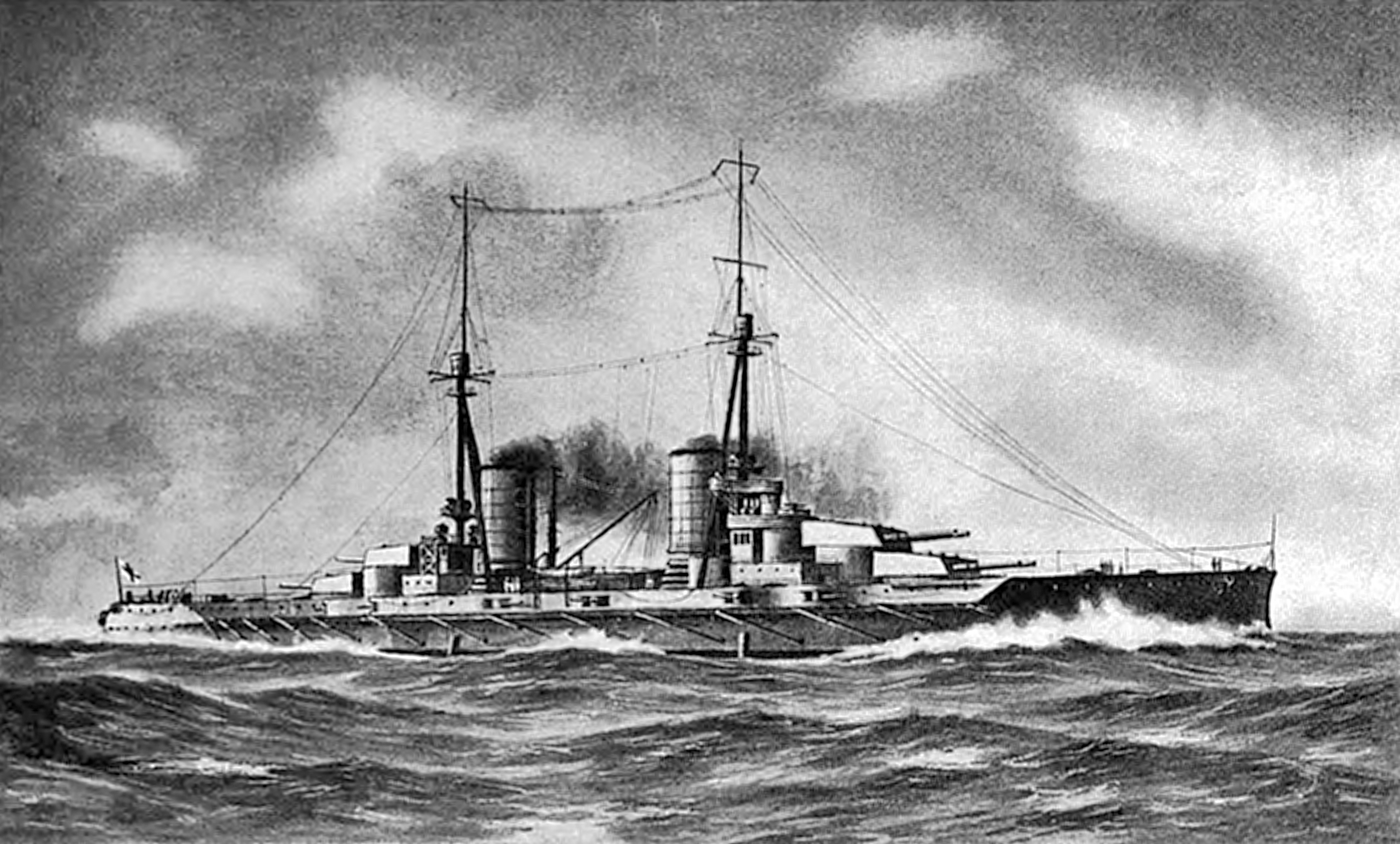
Illustration of Salamis had she been completed during World War I and taken over by the Imperial German Navy

Starting in 1911, the Ottoman Empire—Greece's traditional naval rival—set about modernizing its fleet. That year, the Ottomans ordered the dreadnought Reşadiye. The expansion of Ottoman naval power threatened Greek control of the Aegean; to counter the Ottoman dreadnought, Greece decided to order a dreadnought of its own, Salamis, from a German shipyard. The keel was laid down on 23 July 1913; the hull was complete and ready for launching by 11 November 1914. However, the outbreak of World War I in August 1914 interrupted her completion; work stopped on 31 December 1914. The guns that had been ordered for the ship in the United States were instead sold by the manufacturer, Bethlehem Steel, to the Royal Navy to arm the British Abercrombie-class monitors. After the end of the war, the Greek Navy refused to accept the incomplete hull. She was eventually scrapped in 1932 following a lengthy arbitration between the Greek Navy and the German shipyard.

Summary of the Salamis
| Ship | Armament | Armor | Displacement | Propulsion | Service | | |
| Ship | Armament | Armor | Displacement | Propulsion | Laid down | Commissioned | Fate |
|---|---|---|---|---|---|---|---|
| Salamis | 8 × 14 in (360 mm) guns | 9.875 in (250.8 mm) | 19,500 long tons (19,800 t) | 3 shafts, 3 steam turbines, 23 kn (43 km/h; 26 mph) | 23 July 1913 | — | Work halted 31 December 1914, broken up in 1932 |

== Vasilefs Konstantinos ==
Following the Ottoman purchase of a second dreadnought in December 1913, Sultân Osmân-ı Evvel, a previously Brazilian ship still under construction, the Greek Navy sought a second dreadnought of its own. Greece reportedly first attempted to purchase the Chilean battleship Almirante Latorre and either of the two Brazilian Minas Geraes class dreadnoughts, but these purchases did not materialize. The New York Shipbuilding Corporation did propose three old United States Navy pre-dreadnought battleships, but this offer was in turn refused by Greek authorities. Instead, as compensation for French banking support in the Ottoman purchase of Sultân Osmân-ı Evvel, the French government offered to finance construction of a new battleship for Greece in a French dockyard, which was accepted by Greece. The new battleship was to be named Vasilefs Konstantinos and was to be built to the same design as the French Bretagne class from AC de St Nazaire Penhoet, albeit with an additional dozen 3 inch guns and more powerful machinery to bring her up to the same 23-knot speed of Salamis. Work began in June 1914 but ceased on the outbreak of war in August and never resumed. The Greek Navy refused the incomplete ship after the end of the war, leading to a contract dispute, which was settled in 1925. The unfinished ship was subsequently broken up for scrap.

Summary of the Vasilefs Konstantinos
| Ship | Armament | Armor | Displacement | Propulsion | Service | | |
| Ship | Armament | Armor | Displacement | Propulsion | Laid down | Commissioned | Fate |
|---|---|---|---|---|---|---|---|
| Vasilefs Konstantinos | 10 × 34 cm (13.4 in) guns | 11 in (280 mm) | 25,000 long tons (25,000 t) | 4 shafts, 4 steam turbines, 23 kn (43 km/h; 26 mph) | 12 June 1914 | — | Work halted August 1914, broken up in 1925 |

== Kilkis and Lemnos ==
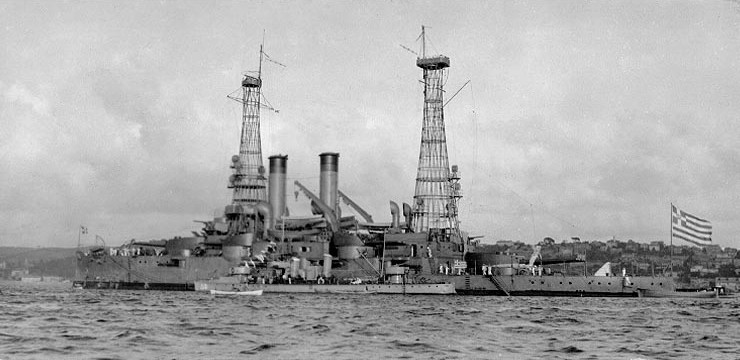
Lemnos after her purchase by Greece

Kilkis and Lemnos were built by the United States Navy between 1904 and 1908, originally named Mississippi and Idaho. They served with the US fleet until June 1914, when they were purchased by the Greek Navy as a stop-gap measure. They were needed to counter Ottoman naval expansion while the Greeks waited on their newly ordered dreadnoughts to be completed abroad. Greece had initially attempted for a second time to purchase the Chilean battleship Almirante Latorre, as well as the Argentinean battleship Moreno, the German battleship Kronprinz, and the Japanese battlecruiser Kongō. All of these offers were rebuked or turned down. The purchase of the American battleships, provided shortly after, was therefore the only option left. The two ships reached Greece in July 1914, just before the outbreak of World War I at the end of the month. As Greece remained neutral during the first three years of the war, the two ships saw little service. In October 1916, the French seized the Greek fleet and disarmed Kilkis and Lemnos; they were put back into service at the end of the war. Both ships saw service during the Greco–Turkish War in 1919–1922, with Lemnos also participating in the Allied intervention in the Russian Civil War.

Both ships continued to see service in the Greek fleet until the early 1930s, with Kilkis serving as the flagship of the fleet. In 1932, Lemnos was disarmed and used as a barracks ship, and Kilkis was reduced to a training ship. Lemnos was used as a barracks ship after 1937, and Kilkis became a floating battery at Salamis Naval Base in 1940. During the German invasion of Greece in April 1941, both ships were attacked and sunk in Salamis. German Ju 87 Stuka dive-bombers bombed both ships in the harbor; Kilkis was sunk outright while Lemnos was beached to avoid sinking. Both ships were broken up after the end of the war.

Summary of the Kilkis class
| Ship | Armament | Armor | Displacement | Propulsion | Service | | |
| Ship | Armament | Armor | Displacement | Propulsion | Laid down | Commissioned | Fate |
|---|---|---|---|---|---|---|---|
| Kilkis | 4 × 12 inch guns | 9 in (230 mm) | 14,465 long tons (14,697 t) | 2 shafts, triple expansion engines, 17 kn (31 km/h; 20 mph) | 12 May 1904 | 22 July 1914 | Sunk by German bombers, 23 April 1941 |
| Lemnos | 4 × 12 inch guns | 9 in (230 mm) | 14,465 long tons (14,697 t) | 2 shafts, triple expansion engines, 17 kn (31 km/h; 20 mph) | 12 May 1904 | 22 July 1914 | Sunk by German bombers, 23 April 1941 |

== See also ==
- List of battleships
