= Greek battleship Kilkis =

Pre-dreadnought battleship of the United States Navy and the Greek Navy

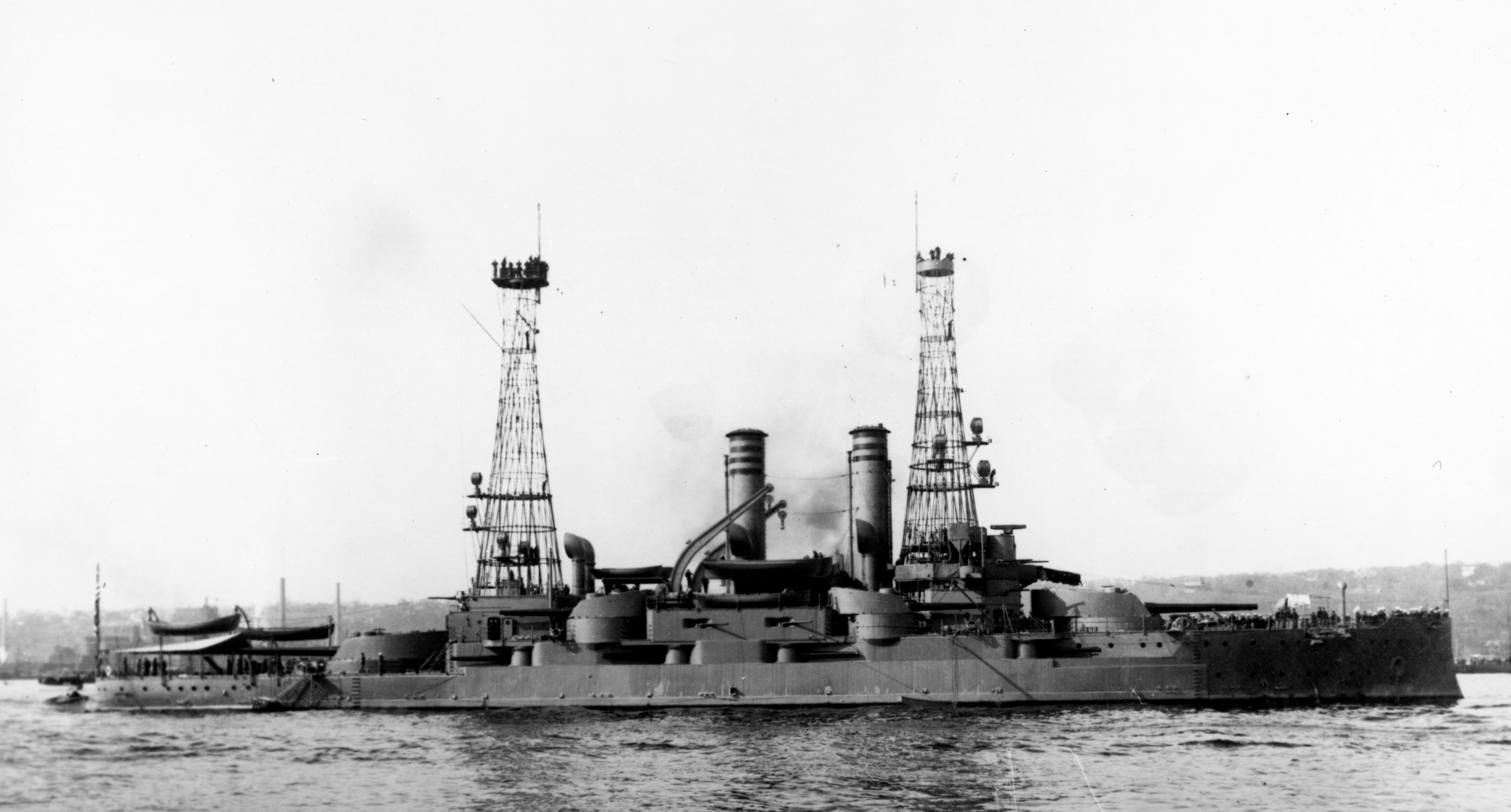
- Mississippi, while still in US Navy service

History

United States
- Name: Mississippi
- Namesake: Mississippi
- Builder: William Cramp & Sons, Philadelphia
- Laid down: 12 May 1904
- Launched: 30 September 1905
- Commissioned: 1 February 1908
- Decommissioned: 10 July 1914
- Identification: Hull number: BB-23
- Fate: Sold to Greece, 8 July 1914

Greece
- Name: Kilkis
- Namesake: Battle of Kilkis–Lachanas
- Acquired: 21 July 1914
- Fate: Sunk on 23 April 1941

General characteristics
- Class & type: Mississippi-class battleship
- Displacement: Normal: 13,000 long tons (13,209 t); Full load: 14,465 long tons (14,697 t)
- Length: 382 ft (116.4 m)
- Beam: 77 ft (23.5 m)
- Draft: 24 ft 8 in (7.5 m)
- Installed power: 8 × Babcock & Wilcox boilers; 10,000 ihp (7,500 kW)
- Propulsion: 2 × triple-expansion steam engines; 2 × screw propellers
- Speed: 17 knots (31 km/h; 20 mph)
- Crew: 744
- Armament: 4 × 12-inch (305 mm) guns; 8 × 8-inch (203 mm) guns; 8 × 7-inch (178 mm) guns; 12 × 3-inch (76 mm) guns; 6 × 3-pounder guns; 2 × 1-pounder guns; 2 × 21-inch (533 mm) torpedo tubes
- Armor: Belt: 9 in (229 mm); Turrets: 12 in (305 mm); Conning tower: 9 in (229 mm)

USS Mississippi (hull number: BB-23) was the lead ship of the Mississippi class originally built by the US Navy in 1904–1908. The class was built to a design smaller than other American battleships as the result of a limit on displacement imposed by Congress as part of an effort to constrain costs. The ships were armed with a main battery of four 12 in (305 mm), the standard for pre-dreadnought battleships of the time, but to secure that heavy primary armament, significant compromises in speed, secondary batteries, and armor protection were necessary to keep the ship within the prescribed displacement limit.

Mississippi served with the Atlantic Fleet from 1909 to 1912, which consisted primarily of routine training operations. In 1910, she and other ships of the fleet visited Europe and in 1912, she carried marines to Cuba during civil unrest in the country. Too slow to operate effectively with the fleet, she was placed in reserve in 1912. Mississippi was reactivated in January 1914 for use as an aviation support ship assigned to the Naval Air Station Pensacola, and she supported flying boats during the occupation of Veracruz, Mexico in April 1914. By this time, the navy was prepared to dispose of the ship, and Greece, which had entered a naval arms race with the Ottoman Empire, sought to acquire warships as quickly as possible.

Greece bought Mississippi in July 1914 and renamed her Kilkis (Greek: Θ/Κ Κιλκίς); she thereafter became the flagship of the Greek fleet. She did not see action during World War I, as the Greek government remained neutral until 1917, and after entering the war she only served as a harbor defense ship. She saw service during the Allied intervention in the Russian Civil War and the Greco-Turkish War of 1919–1922, supporting landings in Turkey and covering the final withdrawal of Greek forces in September 1922. Still plagued by her low speed, Kilkis was withdrawn from flagship duties in 1930, placed in reserve in 1932, and used as a training ship until the outbreak of World War II, after which she was used as a floating battery. During the German invasion of Greece on 23 April, she was attacked and sunk by German Ju 87 Stuka dive-bombers at Salamis Naval Base, together with her sister ship Lemnos. The two ships were ultimately raised in the 1950s and broken up for scrap.

== Design ==
Plan and profile drawing of the Mississippi class

The two Mississippi-class battleships were ordered under the terms of the 1903 naval appropriations, which stipulated a maximum designed displacement of 13,000 long tons (13,209 t). The limit was an effort led by senior naval officers including Admiral George Dewey and Captain Alfred Thayer Mahan, who believed a force of smaller but more numerous pre-dreadnought battleships would better suit the navy's needs. Elements in Congress also opposed the continually increasing size, and more importantly, cost of each new battleship design. The limited displacement amounted to a reduction of 3,000 long tons (3,048 t) compared to the preceding Connecticut class, which necessitated significant compromises in speed, armament, and armor, making them poor designs unable to serve with the main fleet and led to their quick disposal.

Mississippi was 382 feet (116 m) long overall and had a beam of 77 ft (23 m) and a draft of 24 ft 8 in (7.52 m). She displaced 13,000 long tons as designed and up to 14,465 long tons (14,697 t) at full load. The ship was powered by two-shaft vertical triple-expansion steam engines with steam provided by eight coal-fired Babcock & Wilcox boilers that were ducted into two funnels. The engines were rated to produce 10,000 indicated horsepower (7,500 kW) for a top speed of 17 knots (31 km/h; 20 mph). Lattice masts were installed in 1909. She had a crew of 744 officers and enlisted men.

The ship was armed with a main battery of four 12 in (305 mm) L/45 guns in two twin turrets, one on either end of the superstructure. Eight 8 in (203 mm) L/45 guns were mounted in four twin turrets, two on other side of the vessel amidships. The secondary battery was rounded out with eight 7 in (178 mm) L/45 guns mounted individually in casemates along the length of the hull, two fewer than the Connecticut class. Close-range defense against torpedo boats was protected by a battery of twelve 3 in (76 mm) L/50 guns (compared to twenty aboard the Connecticuts), six 3-pounder guns and two 1-pounder guns. The ship's armament system was completed by two 21 in (533 mm) torpedo tubes submerged in her hull.

The ship's main armored belt was 7 to 9 in (178 to 229 mm) thick and, reduced to 4 to 7 in (100 to 180 mm) on either end. This amounted to a two-inch reduction compared to the Connecticuts. The main battery gun turrets had 12 in (305 mm) thick faces, mounted atop 10 in (250 mm) barbettes. Her secondary battery was protected by 7 in (180 mm) side armor. The forward conning tower had 9 in thick sides.

== Service history ==
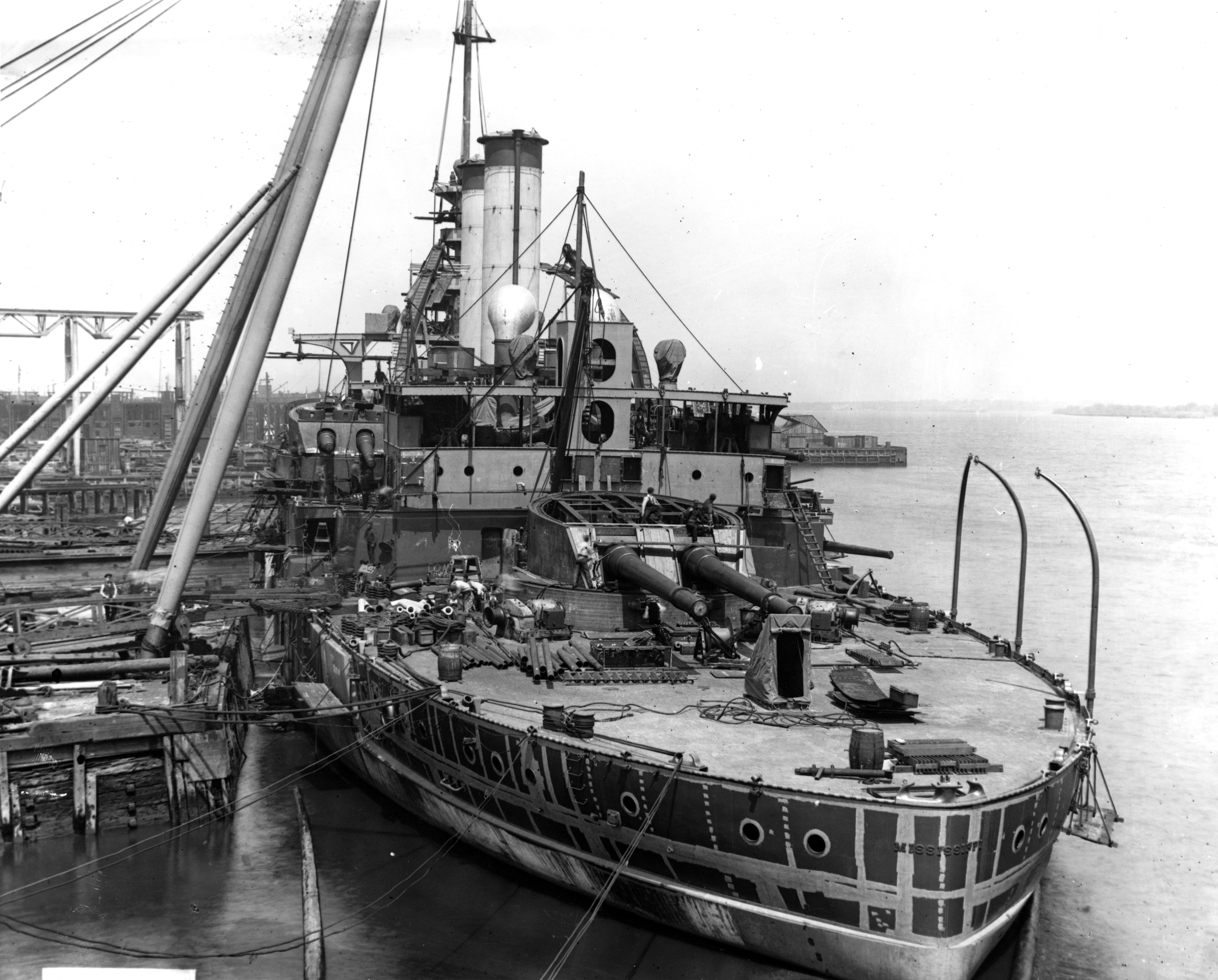
Mississippi during fitting out

=== United States career ===
==== Construction – 1910 ====
Laid down at the William Cramp & Sons shipyard in Philadelphia on 12 May 1904, the ship was launched on 30 September 1905 and was commissioned into the United States Navy on 1 January 1908 as USS Mississippi. The ship left Philadelphia on 15 February to begin sea trials that lasted from 24 February to 9 March. She went to the Philadelphia Naval Shipyard for final fitting-out on 15 March, and embarked on further trials beginning on 1 July. Over the course of the following months, she visited numerous ports along the east coast of the United States before returning to Philadelphia on 10 September for repairs that lasted into 1909.

On 16 January 1909, Mississippi left Philadelphia, bound for Key West, Florida by way of Hampton Roads. There, she met the battleship Maine and the two ships proceeded south to Havana, Cuba on 25 January, where they represented the United States at the inauguration ceremony for President José Miguel Gómez. On 28 January, she went to Guantánamo Bay and thereafter cruised the area until 10 February, when she was assigned to the Third Division of the Atlantic Fleet. She met the returning Great White Fleet off Hampton Roads and was present for the naval review in the harbor there on 22 February. Mississippi returned to Guantanamo Bay on 8 March for gunnery training there in April. From there, she crossed the Caribbean Sea to steam up the Mississippi River as far north as Natchez, Mississippi. She then returned to the east coast of the US, stopping in Philadelphia in June and then in Eastport, Maine for Independence Day celebrations on 4 July. More gunnery training followed in Cape Cod Bay, along with maneuvers with the Atlantic Fleet and various port visits through September. These operations culminated in the Hudson–Fulton Celebration in September and October. After periodic maintenance at Philadelphia in October, she visited New Orleans and other ports in the area before returning for more repairs at Philadelphia.

Mississippi got underway on 5 January 1910, again headed for Cuba, where she joined the other units of the Atlantic Fleet for training from 12 January to 24 March. She then steamed to Hampton Roads, arriving there on 4 April, and taking part in target practice from then until 28 April. More repairs followed in Philadelphia, lasting until 16 July. She then conducted torpedo training in Maine in late July before embarking a contingent from the Rhode Island Naval Militia for sea training that included further torpedo drills. In August, she steamed south to Hampton Roads for more shooting training and battle practice with the fleet through September. Another stint in the Philadelphia Naval Shipyard followed from 5 October to 1 November, after which she and the rest of the Third Division crossed the Atlantic to visit Europe, including stops in Gravesend, United Kingdom and Brest, France. On the way back to Cuban waters, the ships conducted mock battle training.

==== 1911–1914 ====
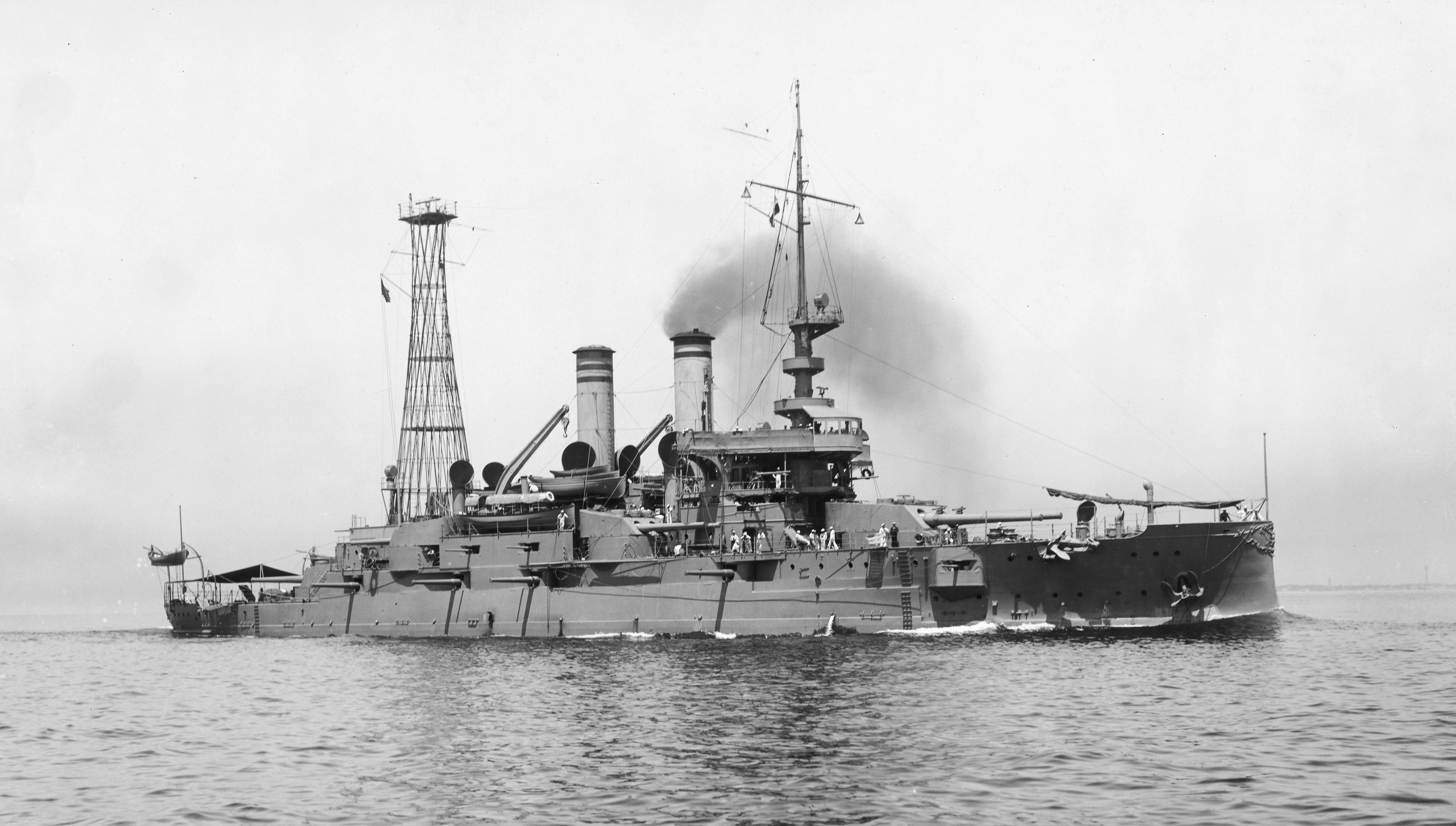
Mississippi after her aft lattice mast was installed in 1909

On 13 January 1911, Mississippi arrived in Guantanamo Bay, and she spent the following two months conducting various maneuvers with the Atlantic Fleet. She left the area on 13 March and arrived in Hampton Roads four days later. Further training followed over the next month, after which she returned to Philadelphia for periodic maintenance that lasted from 12 April to 1 May. She thereafter cruised the east coast of the US in company with the other ships of the division and into the Gulf of Mexico, proceeding as far as Galveston, Texas. Mississippi embarked a group from the New York Naval Militia for a training cruise that lasted from 13 to 22 July, and in August took part in maneuvers with torpedo boats off the coast of Massachusetts. She returned to Hampton Roads on 24 August to meet the rest of the fleet for shooting practice. She participated in a naval review for President William Howard Taft in the North River on 1 November.

The ship then returned to Hampton Roads for training with the Second Squadron before stopping in Newport News, Virginia on 24 November. Another period of repair work at Philadelphia followed from 8 December to 16 March 1912, when she departed to rejoin the fleet off Hampton Roads. She took part in a variety of training exercises through 22 April, when she was detached from the fleet for cruising trials off Provincetown, Massachusetts. Her squadron joined her there on 15 May for exercises that began five days later. On 26 May, Mississippi, seven other battleships, and the armored cruiser Washington, embarked a contingent of marines from the 2nd Marine Regiment and carried them to Cuba, where they assisted the Cuban government in suppressing the Negro Rebellion. The fleet arrived on 19 June, disembarked the marines, and then remained in Guantanamo Bay until conditions in the country improved, allowing the fleet to leave for training. Fleet and division maneuvers began on 10 July off the coast of Rhode Island and Connecticut and on 1 August, Mississippi went to Philadelphia, where she was placed in reserve.

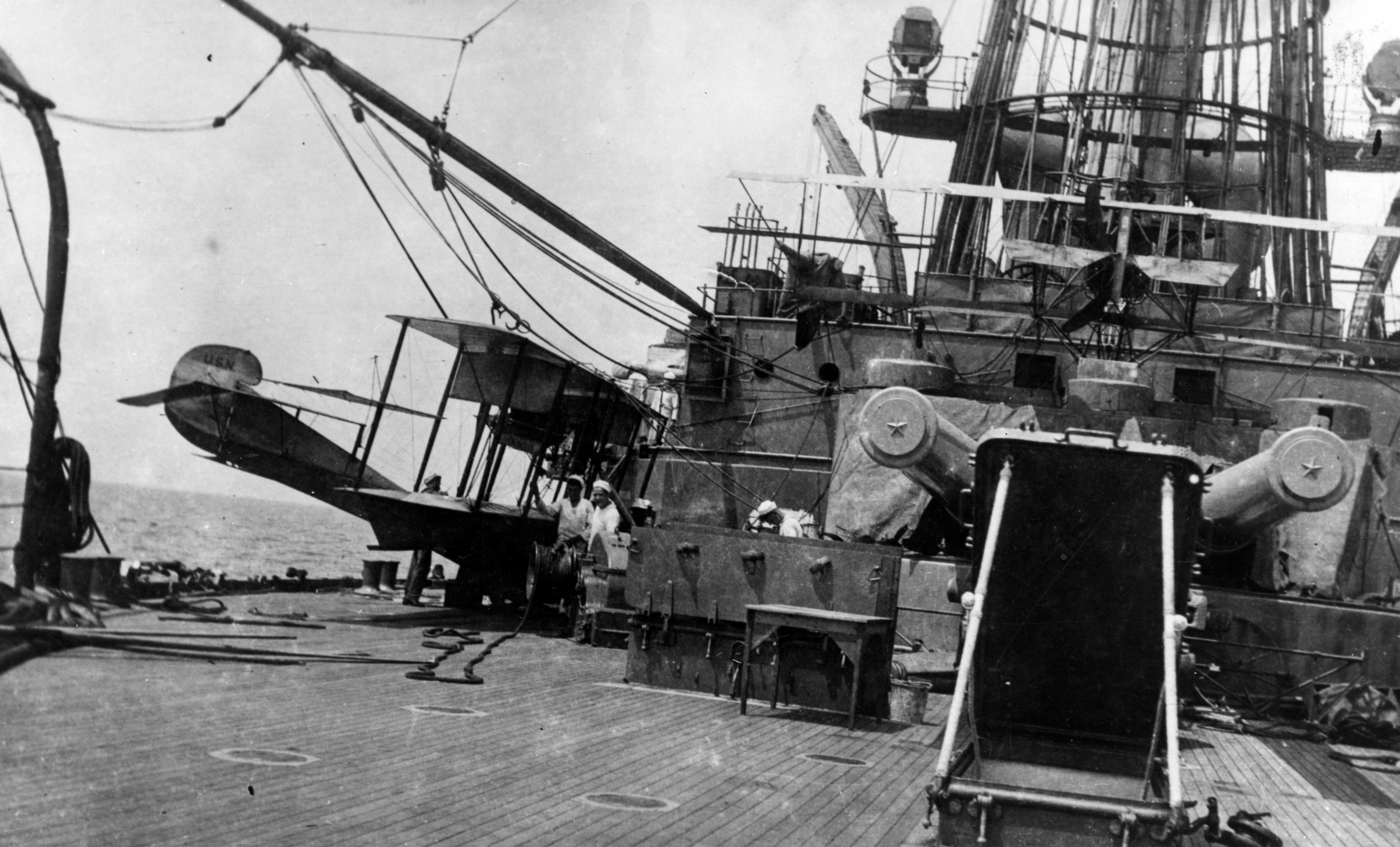
Mississippi's quarterdeck, showing a Curtiss AB flying boat aboard the ship

She remained in the Atlantic Reserve Fleet until 30 December 1913, when she was sent to Pensacola, Florida for use as a support ship for the creation of the Naval Air Station Pensacola. She took on a group of nine officers and twenty-three enlisted men along with aircraft and other equipment. She arrived there on 20 January 1914, where the men set about establishing the base. In April, Mississippi received orders to carry a 500-man detachment from the 2nd Marines, who had by then transferred to Pensacola, to Tampico, Mexico after the Tampico Affair that saw a minor confrontation between Mexican soldiers and USN sailors. She also carried a pair of seaplanes and supporting equipment. The ship got underway for Veracruz, Mexico on 21 April, arriving there four days later. On April 25, a Curtiss Model F she carried flew in the first operational use of naval aircraft, performing a 28-minute reconnaissance flight over the port. The next day, she transferred both seaplanes to shore, along with their ground crews and other equipment. The aircraft operated under command of Patrick N. L. Bellinger in the area for a month and a half during the occupation of Veracruz, conducting reconnaissance and searching the surrounding sea for naval mines, supported by men from Mississippi. In late May, the ship departed for Pensacola, where she remained until 28 June, thereafter steaming north for Hampton Roads.

Greece became engaged in a naval arms race with the Ottoman Empire in the early 1910s; in 1910 the Ottomans had purchased a pair of German pre-dreadnoughts (renamed Barbaros Hayreddin and Turgut Reis) and ordered dreadnought battleships from Britain in 1911 and 1914. The Royal Hellenic Navy ordered the dreadnought Salamis from Germany in 1913 and the dreadnought Basileus Konstantinos from France in response. As a stop-gap measure, the Greeks purchased Mississippi and Idaho from the US Navy. The Greek government bought the ships through an intermediary, the shipbuilder Fred Gauntlett, who acquired them on 8 July and handed them over to Greece. Two days later, Mississippi and Idaho were taken to Newport News and were decommissioned and transferred to the Greek Navy on 21 July. Renamed Kilkis and Lemnos, respectively, they quickly left the United States after their transfer due to the rising tensions in Europe following the assassination of Archduke Franz Ferdinand of Austria the previous month. After arriving in Greece, Kilkis became the flagship of the Greek fleet.

=== Greek career ===
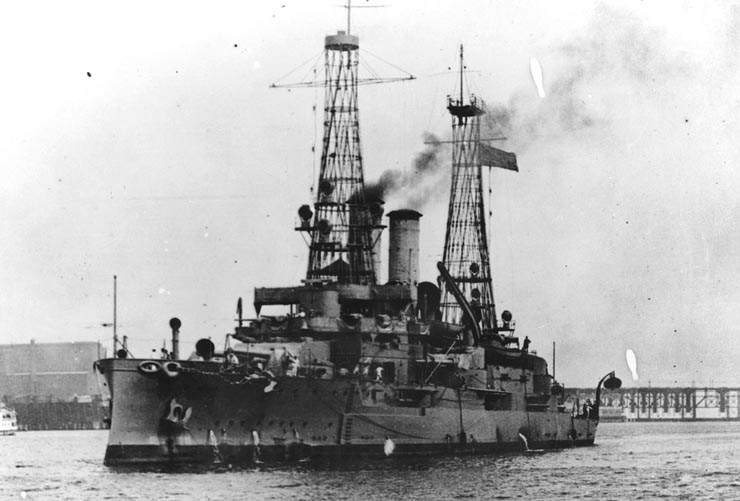
Kilkis or Lemnos in port in the United States

At the outbreak of World War I in July 1914, Greece's pro-German monarch, Constantine I, decided to remain neutral, so the ships saw no action. The Entente powers landed troops in Salonika in 1915, which was a source of tension between France and Greece. Ultimately, the French seized the Hellenic Navy on 19 October 1916 (see Noemvriana and National Schism). Kilkis was reduced to a skeleton crew and had the breech blocks for her guns removed to render them inoperable. All ammunition and torpedoes were also removed. Ultimately, a pro-Entente government replaced Constantine and declared war on the Central Powers. Kilkis, however, did not see active service with Greece's new allies, and instead was used solely for harbor defense until the end of the war.

After the end of World War I Kilkis saw service in the Allied intervention in the Russian Civil War in the Black Sea. While supporting the French and British forces defending Sevastopol in April 1919, Kilkis observed mutinies on several French battleships. Her crew taunted the French mutineers by hanging a dummy from the yardarm. Kilkis then returned to Greece. During the subsequent Greco-Turkish War, Kilkis served in support of landings to seize Ottoman territory. On 15 May 1919, she and a pair of destroyers escorted a convoy of six transports carrying the troops that undertook the occupation of Smyrna and its environs. Kilkis carried Rear Admiral Kaloulides, who thereafter served as the military governor of the city. The Ottoman Navy had been interned by the Allies after the end of World War I, and so provided no opposition to the Royal Hellenic Navy's activities.

In March 1920, Kilkis was stationed in Constantinople as part of an Allied fleet, which was composed primarily of British warships. The ships' crews practiced landing operations to support the garrison occupying the city, but in the event only crews from the British ships went ashore. Kilkis left the theater to represent Greece during the Fleet Review in Spithead to honor King George V on his birthday, 3 June 1920. In July, Kilkis and a pair of destroyers escorted a convoy carrying 7,000 infantrymen, 1,000 artillerists, and 4,000 mules to Panderma. Among the Greek naval vessels that supported the landings with Kilkis were the armored cruiser Georgios Averof and the destroyers Aetos, Leon, and Ierax, and a hospital ship. Landings also took place at Eregli on the other side of the Sea of Marmora. On 19 July, Kilkis departed with several transport ships and the British seaplane carrier HMS Ark Royal, which provided aerial reconnaissance for the Greek forces. Operations came to a close in September 1922 when the Greek Army was forced to evacuate by sea, along with a sizable number of civilians, from Asia Minor. The fleet transported a total of 250,000 soldiers and civilians during the evacuation. Kilkis and Lemnos departed Smyrna on the evening of 8 September.

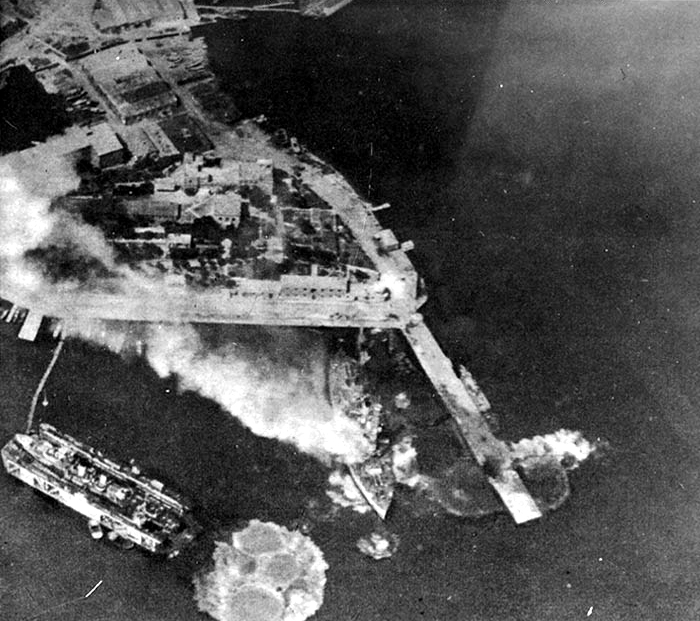
Kilkis under attack by German bombers

Kilkis underwent repairs and upgrades in 1926–1928 but was already obsolete due to low speed and low freeboard. The ship had her boilers re-tubed during this refit. On 29 November 1929, the Hellenic Navy announced that Kilkis would be withdrawn from service and broken up for scrap. Consequently, in 1930, Georgios Averof replaced her as the fleet flagship. Nevertheless, Kilkis remained in service with the fleet until 1932. The ship was then withdrawn from the active fleet and used as a training ship. A failed insurrection in the Greek fleet in March 1935 led to Kilkis being reactivated in response to the capture of Georgios Averof being seized by the revolutionaries. After the revolt collapsed, Kilkis was used as a training ship for anti-aircraft gunners.

==== World War II ====
On 28 October 1940, Italy invaded Greece, initiating the Greco-Italian War as part of the Italian dictator Benito Mussolini's expansionist ambitions. The Greek army quickly defeated the Italians and pushed them back to Albania. Less than two weeks later, the Italian fleet was badly damaged in the British Raid on Taranto, which significantly reduced the threat the Italian Regia Marina posed to the Greek fleet. From the start of the conflict, Kilkis was used as a floating battery based in Salamis. Spare guns from Kilkis and Lemnos were employed as coastal batteries throughout Greece.

On 6 April 1941, the German Wehrmacht invaded Greece to support its Italian ally in the stalemated conflict. British planners suggested using the ship to block the Corinth Canal by scuttling her at the southern entrance to the canal, but the Greeks refused, preferring to use the ship as a barracks ship if they should have to retreat from Salamis. The ship was attacked in Salamis Naval Base by Ju 87 Stuka dive bombers on 23 April 1941, during the German invasion. Kilkis attempted to get underway to evade the attacks, but she was hit by several bombs and sank in the harbor. Her wreck was refloated and broken up for scrap in the 1950s.
