= Greek battleship Lemnos =

Pre-dreadnought battleship of the United States Navy and the Greek Navy

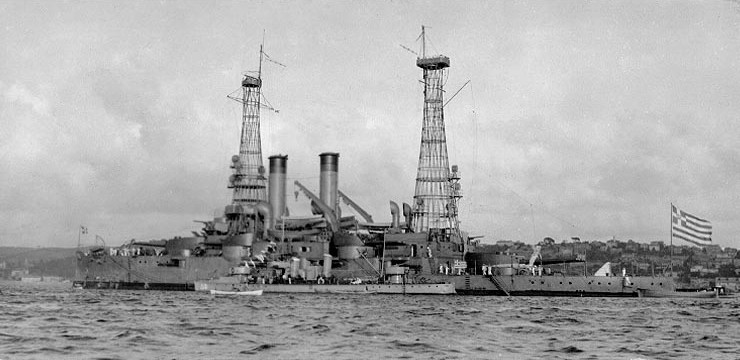
- Lemnos – Θ/Κ Λήμνος

History

United States
- Name: Idaho
- Namesake: Idaho
- Builder: William Cramp & Sons, Philadelphia
- Laid down: 12 May 1904
- Launched: 9 December 1905
- Commissioned: 1 April 1908
- Identification: Hull number: BB-24
- Fate: Sold to Greece, 1914

Greece
- Name: Lemnos
- Namesake: Battle of Lemnos
- Commissioned: 22 July 1914
- Decommissioned: 1932
- Fate: Sunk on April 23, 1941 near Salamis

General characteristics
- Class & type: Mississippi-class battleship
- Displacement: Normal: 13,000 long tons (13,209 t); Full load: 14,465 long tons (14,697 t)
- Length: 382 ft (116.4 m)
- Beam: 77 ft (23.5 m)
- Draft: 24 ft 8 in (7.5 m)
- Installed power: 8 × Babcock & Wilcox boilers; 10,000 ihp (7,500 kW)
- Propulsion: 2 × triple-expansion steam engines; 2 × screw propellers
- Speed: 17 knots (20 mph; 31 km/h)
- Crew: 744
- Armament: 4 × 12-inch (305 mm) guns; 8 × 8-inch (203 mm) guns; 8 × 7-inch (178 mm) guns; 12 × 3-inch (76 mm) guns; 6 × 3-pounder guns; 2 × 1-pounder guns; 2 × 21-inch (533 mm) torpedo tubes
- Armor: Belt: 9 in (229 mm); Turrets: 12 in (305 mm); Conning tower: 9 in (229 mm)

Lemnos or Limnos was the English-language name of Θ/Κ Λήμνος, a 13,000 ton Mississippi-class battleship originally built by the United States Navy in 1904–1908. As USS Idaho (hull number: BB-24), she was purchased by the Greek Navy in 1914 and renamed Lemnos, along with her sister Mississippi, renamed Kilkis. Lemnos was named for the Battle of Lemnos, a crucial engagement of the First Balkan War. Armed with a main battery of four 12 in (305 mm) guns, Lemnos and her sister were the most powerful vessels in the Greek fleet.

The ship saw limited action during World War I. Greece's pro-German monarch, Constantine I opted to remain neutral until October 1916, when pressure from the opposing Triple Entente forced him to abdicate in favor of a pro-Entente government. For the remainder of the war, Lemnos operated solely as a harbor defense ship. In the aftermath of World War I, she saw service during the Allied intervention in the Russian Civil War and the Greco-Turkish War of 1919–1922. During the war with Turkey, Lemnos supported Greek landings in Turkey and participated in the final Greek sea-borne withdrawal in 1922. She remained in service until 1932, when she was used as a barracks ship and subsequently disarmed. During the Second World War German invasion of Greece in 1941, she and her sister were sunk in Salamis by German Junkers Ju 87 dive bombers. The two ships were ultimately raised and broken up for scrap after the end of the war.

== Design ==
Plan and profile drawing of the Mississippi class

The two Mississippi-class battleships were ordered under the terms of the 1903 naval appropriations, which stipulated a maximum designed displacement of 13,000 long tons (13,209 t), as recommended by senior naval officers including Admiral George Dewey and Captain Alfred Thayer Mahan, who believed a force of smaller but more numerous (pre-dreadnought) battleships would better suit the navy's needs. Elements in Congress also opposed the continually increasing size and, more importantly, cost of battleship designs. The displacement was limited to 3,000 long tons (3,048 t) less than the preceding Connecticut class, which necessitated significant compromises in speed, armament, and armor, making them poor designs unable to serve with the main fleet, and led to their quick disposal.

Idaho was 382 feet (116 m) long overall and had a beam of 77 ft (23 m) and a draft of 24 ft 8 in (7.52 m). She displaced 13,000 long tons as designed and up to 14,465 long tons (14,697 t) at full load. The ship was powered by two-shaft vertical triple-expansion steam engines with steam provided by eight coal-fired Babcock & Wilcox boilers that were ducted into two funnels. The engines were rated to produce 10,000 indicated horsepower (7,500 kW) for a top speed of 17 knots (31 km/h; 20 mph). Lattice masts were installed in 1909. She had a crew of 744 officers and enlisted men.

The ship was armed with a main battery of four 12 in (305 mm) L/45 guns in two twin turrets, one on either end of the superstructure. The secondary battery comprised eight 8 in (203 mm) L/45 guns mounted in four twin turrets, two on other side of the vessel amidships and eight 7 in (178 mm) L/45 guns mounted individually in casemates along the length of the hull, two fewer than the Connecticut class. Close-range defense against torpedo boats was provided by a battery of twelve 3 in (76 mm) L/50 guns (compared to twenty aboard the Connecticuts), six 3-pounder guns and two 1-pounder guns. The ship had two 21 in (533 mm) torpedo tubes submerged in her hull.

The ship's main armored belt was 7 to 9 in (178 to 229 mm) thick, reducing to 4 to 7 in (100 to 180 mm) on either end, two inches less than the Connecticuts. The main battery gun turrets had 12 in (305 mm) thick faces, mounted atop 10 in (250 mm) barbettes. Her secondary battery was protected by 7 in (180 mm) side armor. The forward conning tower had 9 in thick sides.

== Service history ==
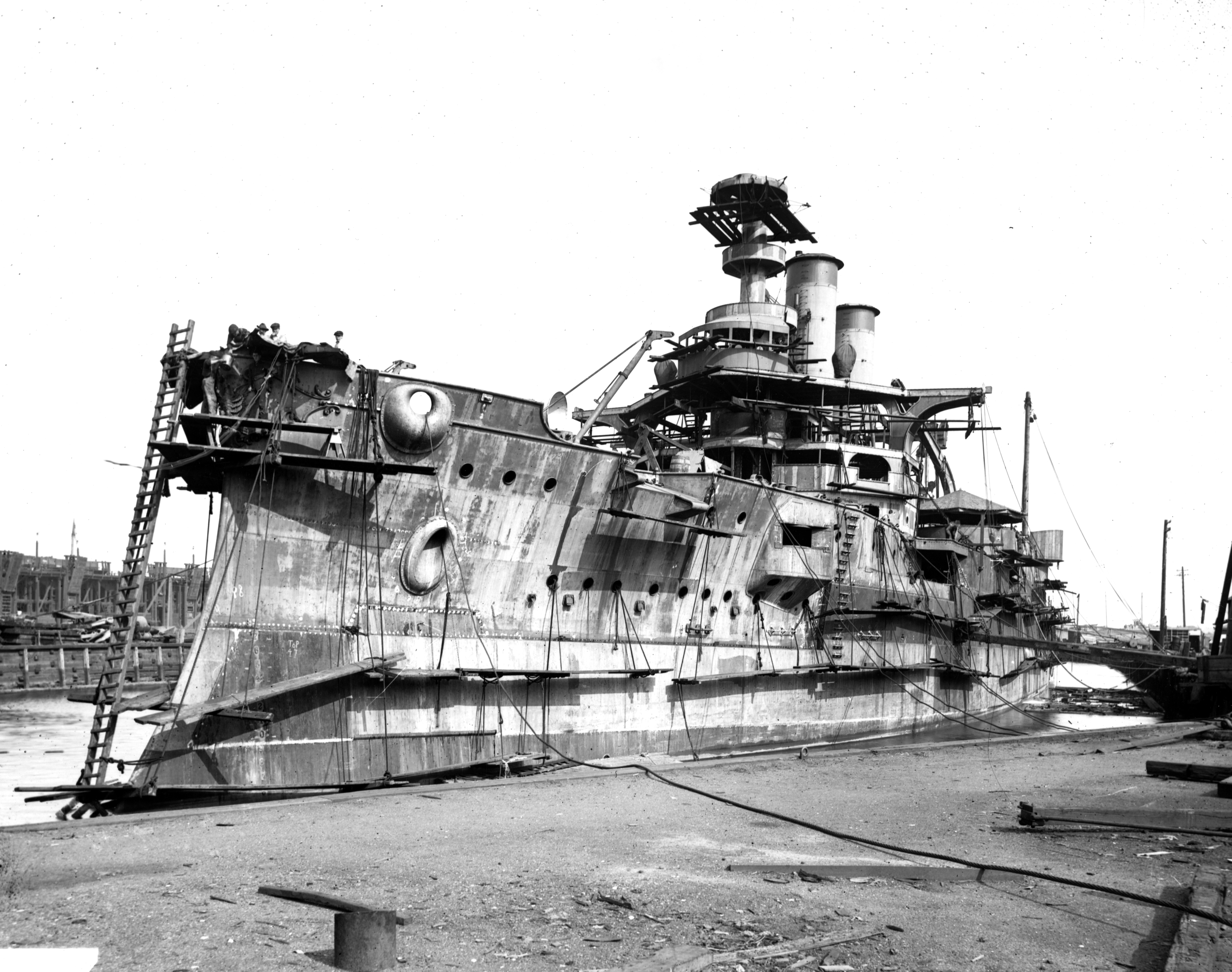
Idaho fitting out at William Cramp & Sons

=== United States career ===
==== Construction – 1910 ====
The keel for Idaho was laid down on 12 May 1904 at the William Cramp & Sons shipyard in Philadelphia. Her completed hull was launched on 9 December 1905 and she was commissioned into the fleet on 1 April 1908. She got underway on 15 April for sea trials, steaming down to Hampton Roads, Virginia where she stopped from 17 to 20 April before continuing on to Guantánamo Bay, Cuba for training exercises into early May. She then steamed back to the Philadelphia Naval Shipyard for repairs and final fitting out.

Idaho embarked on her first operation in company with the battleship New Hampshire on 20 June, carrying a contingent of nearly 800 marines to the Panama Canal Zone to monitor the elections held in Panama. She arrived in Colón, Panama six days later, disembarked the marines, and left for Guantanamo Bay immediately thereafter. She reached the naval base there on 30 June and replenished her coal bunkers before steaming back to the United States. On arriving in Philadelphia, she went into drydock for maintenance that lasted from 6 July to 12 September, after which she went to Norfolk, Virginia, where her mainmast was replaced with a lattice mast. The ship conducted shooting tests later in September, followed by further maintenance in Philadelphia at the end of the month that lasted until 9 February 1909.

After leaving the shipyard, Idaho was assigned to the Third Squadron of the Atlantic Fleet on 17 February, in company with her sister ship Mississippi, New Hampshire, and Maine. The four battleships met the returning Great White Fleet off Hampton Roads and was present for the naval review in the harbor there on 22 February. Idaho then steamed south to Cuban waters for training exercises there in March and April, thereafter returning to Philadelphia on 6 May for further maintenance that concluded on 25 July. She then joined the rest of the fleet off the coast of Massachusetts two days later; after coaling at Hampton Roads in early August, the fleet conducted shooting practice and other exercises off the Virginia Capes beginning on 12 August. These operations culminated in the Hudson–Fulton Celebration in September and October. Another period in the drydock in Philadelphia followed from 6 October to 5 January 1910.

Idaho and the rest of the Atlantic Fleet assembled for training exercises in Guantanamo Bay from 12 January to 24 March, after which the ships returned to Hampton Roads for more shooting training. Repairs at Philadelphia followed for Idaho from 30 April to 17 July. From there, she went to Newport, Rhode Island, where she embarked a contingent from the Rhode Island Naval Militia for a training cruise from 18 to 23 July. After disembarking the men, Idaho began a series of exercises including torpedo and naval mine drills with the rest of the fleet. Shooting practice took place in August and September, followed by another yard period from 2 to 28 October. In early November, the Third Squadron crossed the Atlantic to visit Europe, including stops in Gravesend, United Kingdom and Brest, France. On the way back to Cuban waters, the ships conducted mock battle training. They arrived in Guantanamo Bay on 13 January 1911, and over the next two months the fleet conducted its annual maneuvers there.

==== 1911–1914 ====
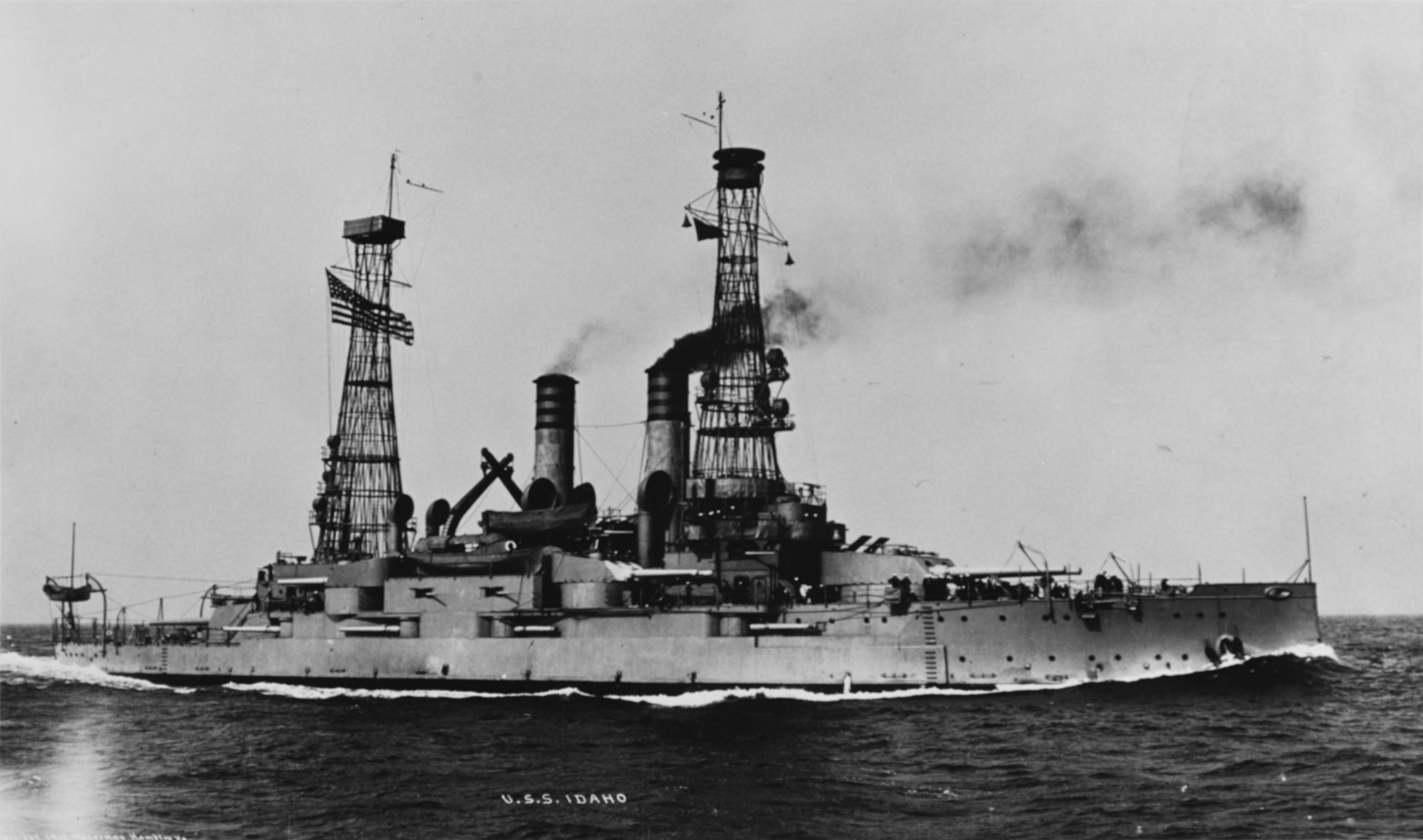
Idaho in 1912 with both lattice masts

The Atlantic Fleet returned to Hampton Roads on 17 March and conducted battle practice later that month and into April. Idaho went back to Philadelphia for maintenance from 12 April to 4 May. From there, she steamed south to the Gulf Coast to cruise the Mississippi River as far north as Natchez, Mississippi. Torpedo training off Pensacola followed in June, after which she once again went to Philadelphia for periodic maintenance. The rest of the year's activities consisted of fleet maneuvers off the coast of Massachusetts in July and August, gunnery training off the Virginia Capes in August and September, another overhaul in September and October, and a naval review in November. Idaho concluded the year with more repairs and sea trials, lasting until 2 January 1912.

Idaho joined the fleet off Hampton Roads on 3 January for war games. Further fleet exercises were held off Cuba from 12 January to 10 February. Her participation in these maneuvers was cut short when her starboard engine broke down, forcing her to return to Philadelphia on 17 February for repairs, which were completed in mid-August. She got underway again on 23 August for Hampton Roads, rendezvousing with the rest of the fleet two days later. Target and torpedo practice followed in September, and in early October she underwent full speed and endurance tests off the coast of Maine. She took part in a naval review in New York City on 7 October, after which she returned to Hampton Roads for more shooting practice. On 7 November, the ship was assigned to the Fourth Division of the fleet. She conducted another round of target practice later that month and on 8 December she returned to Philadelphia for another period of maintenance.

Idaho left Philadelphia on 2 January 1913 to rendezvous with the fleet off Hampton Roads the next day. The assembled ships then got underway on 6 January for Cuba, where torpedo practice and other maneuvers were conducted through mid-March, at which point the fleet returned to Hampton Roads for during training, including target practice. These operations lasted into early April, and Idaho went to Philadelphia for maintenance from 10 to 16 April. By this time, conditions in Mexico had seriously deteriorated during the Mexican Revolution, so the US Navy deployed warships to protect American interests in the country. Idaho was sent to Tampico from 23 April to 22 May as part of these operations. From there, she moved to Veracruz on 23 May, remaining there until 22 June when she left to rejoin the fleet. Beginning on 30 June, the ship cruised off the coast of New England through July, followed by fleet maneuvers off Long Island in August. Further training off the Virginia Capes began later that month and lasted until 24 October. She arrived in Philadelphia the next day, and on 27 October Idaho was reduced to the Atlantic Reserve Fleet.

The ship was reactivated on 16 March 1914 for training duties, and on 9 May she steamed to Annapolis, Maryland. She took on a contingent of midshipmen from the US Naval Academy for a training cruise that began on 7 June. Idaho joined the battleship Missouri for a cruise of the Mediterranean. While still abroad, sale of the ship was being negotiated with the Greek government. Greece had become engaged in a naval arms race with the Ottoman Empire in the early 1910s; in 1910 the Ottomans had purchased a pair of German pre-dreadnoughts (renamed Barbaros Hayreddin and Turgut Reis) and ordered dreadnought battleships from Britain in 1911 and 1914. The Royal Hellenic Navy ordered the dreadnought Salamis from Germany in 1913 and the dreadnought Basileus Konstantinos from France in response. As a stop-gap measure, the Greeks purchased Mississippi and Idaho from the US Navy. The Greek government bought the ships through an intermediary, the shipbuilder Fred Gauntlett, who acquired them on 8 July and handed them over to Greece. In the meantime, Idaho and Missouri stopped in a number of ports in the region: Tangier, Morocco; Gibraltar; and Naples, Italy. After the sale was finalized, Idaho left Missouri and steamed to Villefranche-sur-Mer, France on 17 July, where she transferred her entire crew to the battleship Maine. The Greek Navy formally took possession of the ship on 30 July and renamed her Lemnos after the Battle of Lemnos during the First Balkan War.

=== Greek career ===
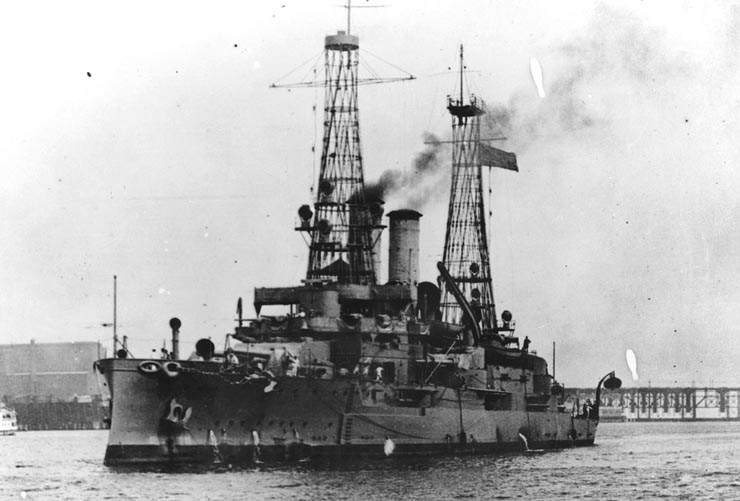
Lemnos or Kilkis in port in the United States

At the outbreak of World War I in at the end of the month, Greece's pro-German monarch, Constantine I, decided to remain neutral. The Entente powers at war with Germany landed troops in Salonika in 1915, which was a source of tension between France and Greece. Ultimately, the French seized the Greek Navy on 19 October 1916 (see Noemvriana and National Schism). Lemnos was reduced to a skeleton crew and had the breech blocks for her guns removed to render them inoperable. All ammunition and torpedoes were also removed. Ultimately, a pro-Entente government under Prime Minister Eleftherios Venizelos replaced Constantine and declared war on the Central Powers. Lemnos, however, did not see active service with Greece's new allies, and instead was used solely for harbor defense until the end of the war.

After the end of World War I, Lemnos joined the Allied intervention in the Russian Civil War and served with the Crimean Expedition. There, she aided the White Russians against the Communists. In April 1919, Lemnos was present in Kaffa Bay, where she provided gunfire support to the Volunteer Army. On 22 April, aerial reconnaissance reported that the Red Army was massing in the town of Vladislovovka; Lemnos and the British light cruiser HMS Caradoc bombarded the town, forcing the Soviet forces to withdraw. She then saw service during the Greco-Turkish War, where she supported landings to seize Ottoman territory. The Ottoman Navy had been interned by the Allies after the end of World War I, and so provided no opposition to the Greek Navy's activities.

In February 1921, Lemnos was stationed in Smyrna to support the occupation of the city. Operations came to a close in September 1922 when the Greek Army was forced to evacuate Smyrna by sea, along with a sizable number of civilians from Asia Minor. The fleet transported a total of 250,000 soldiers and civilians during the evacuation. Lemnos departed Smyrna on the evening of 8 September with her sister Kilkis. While en route from Smyrna to mainland Greece, Captain Dimitrios Fokas, the commander of Lemnos, formed a Revolutionary Committee with Nikolaos Plastiras and Stylianos Gonatas, two colonels who supported Venizelos, who had been ousted in 1920. The men launched the 11 September 1922 Revolution, and other vessels in the fleet mutinied in support of the coup. King Constantine I was forced to abdicate in favor of his son, George II.

In 1926, a plan was drawn up to convert her into an aircraft carrier, but nothing came of these plans. In 1932, Lemnos was placed in inactive reserve; sections of her armor plate was removed to build fortifications on the island of Aegina. She was disarmed in 1937 and thereafter used as a barracks ship.

==== World War II ====
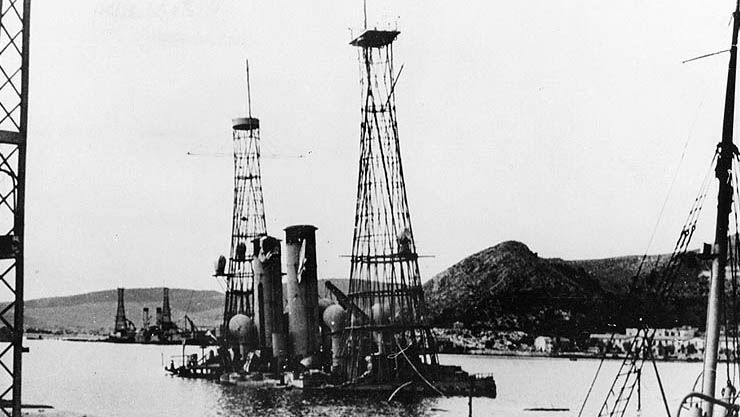
Kilkis (foreground) and Lemnos sunk after German air attack, 1941.

On 28 October 1940, Italy invaded Greece, initiating the Greco-Italian War as part of the Italian dictator Benito Mussolini's expansionist ambitions. The Greek army quickly defeated the Italians and pushed them back to Albania. Less than two weeks later, the Italian fleet was badly damaged in the British Raid on Taranto, which significantly reduced the threat the Italian Regia Marina posed to the Greek fleet. Lemnos remained out of service, but spare guns from her and Kilkis were employed as coastal batteries throughout Greece. On 6 April 1941, the German Wehrmacht invaded Greece to support its Italian ally in the stalemated conflict. The hulk of Lemnos was bombed in Salamis Naval Base by Junkers Ju 87 dive bombers on 23 April. The ship was beached to prevent her from sinking; her wreck was broken up after the end of the war.
