= Salamis Naval Base =

Greek military base by Athens

Salamis Naval Base Ναύσταθμος Σαλαμίνας
- Salamis Island, Greece
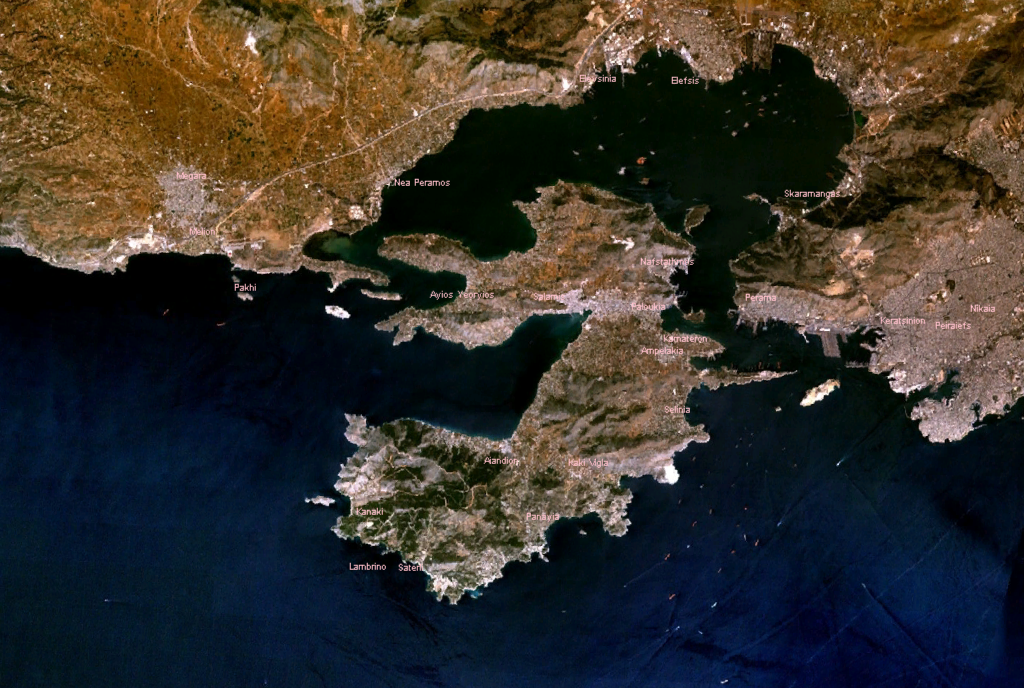
- Satellite view of Salamis Island.

- CoA of Salamis Naval Base

Site information
- Owner: Greece
- Controlled by: Hellenic Navy

Location
- Location of Salamis Naval Base, Greece
- Coordinates: 37°58′25″N 23°32′00″E

Site history
- Built: 1881
- Built by: Greek Government
- In use: 1881 – present

Garrison information
- Garrison: Hellenic Navy Logistics Command - Hellenic Navy General Staff

The Salamis Naval Base (Greek: Ναύσταθμος Σαλαμίνας) is the largest naval base of the Hellenic Navy. It is located in the northeastern part of Salamis Island (Cape Arapis), Greece and in Amphiali and Skaramangas. It is close to the major population centre of Athens.

Most Hellenic Navy ships are based at Salamis, as well as many of its administrative, training and support services. The base employs approximately 10,000 naval and civilian personnel.

== History ==
The first organized Greek Naval Base during the Greek War of Independence (1821 Revolution) was founded on Poros. The facility remained in use as the main naval base of the Royal Hellenic Navy until 1881 and is still used today for naval personnel training.

Between January 1878 and April 1881, certain activities were transferred from Poros to the Faneromeni Monastery (37°59′00″N 23°26′10″E) and its surrounding area, on Salamis Island.

On April 16, 1881, a Royal Decree directed that a new naval base would be built in Salamis, at a location then called Arapi, near Akra (Cape) Arapis. The Navy acquired an area of approximately 300 hectares. Most of the land was donated by the Municipality of Salamis, which saw the construction of the naval base as an opportunity for employment, real estate development and business profit.

Construction of the new base began in 1881 and gradually naval activities were transferred to the new buildings from Poros and Faneromeni Monastery. One of the first buildings was the church of Saint Nikolaos (1882).

The new naval base was used intensively during the Balkan Wars, the First World War and the Second World War. A suburban standard gauge light railway line (Piraeus-Perama light railway) opened in 1936, connecting Piraeus with Perama and terminating inside the naval base at Amphiali. The line remained in use until 1977.

During the Second World War the naval base was occupied by the Germans and used for naval activities, including submarine operations. The Germans retreated in 1944, after causing extensive damage to the installations. In addition the sea channel was blocked by a number of naval ships sunk by the Luftwaffe in 1941, including the decommissioned battleships Lemnos and Kilkis.

Cleanup, salvage and reconstruction work began in November 1944 and the facilities were gradually restored to operational condition. Salamis Naval Base has been in continuous use by the Hellenic Navy ever since, while a second major base was constructed at Souda Bay.

== Structure and activities ==
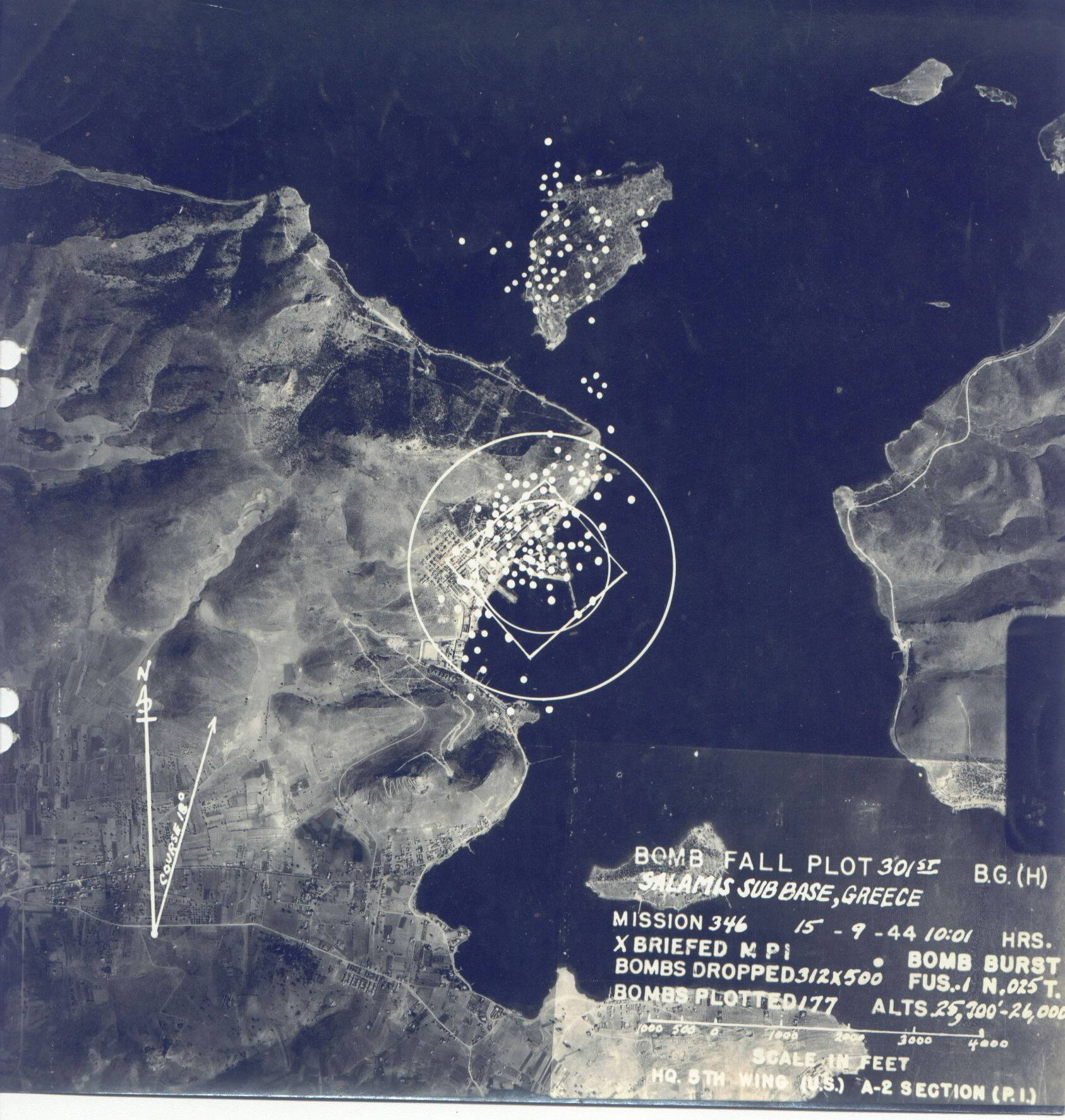
Aerial bombing of Nazi occupied Salamis Naval Dock, September 1944

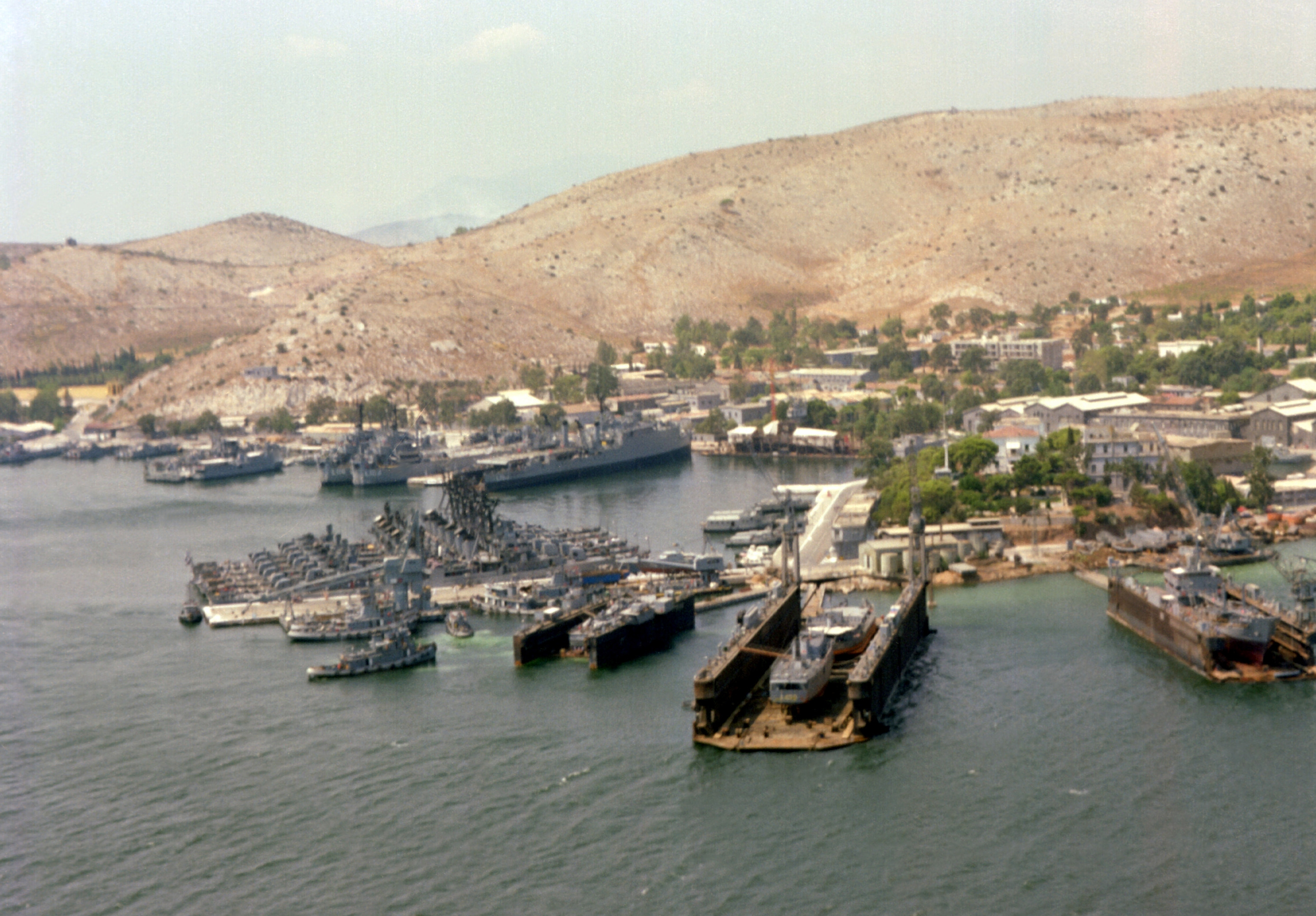
Salamis Naval Base dry dock facilities (1979)

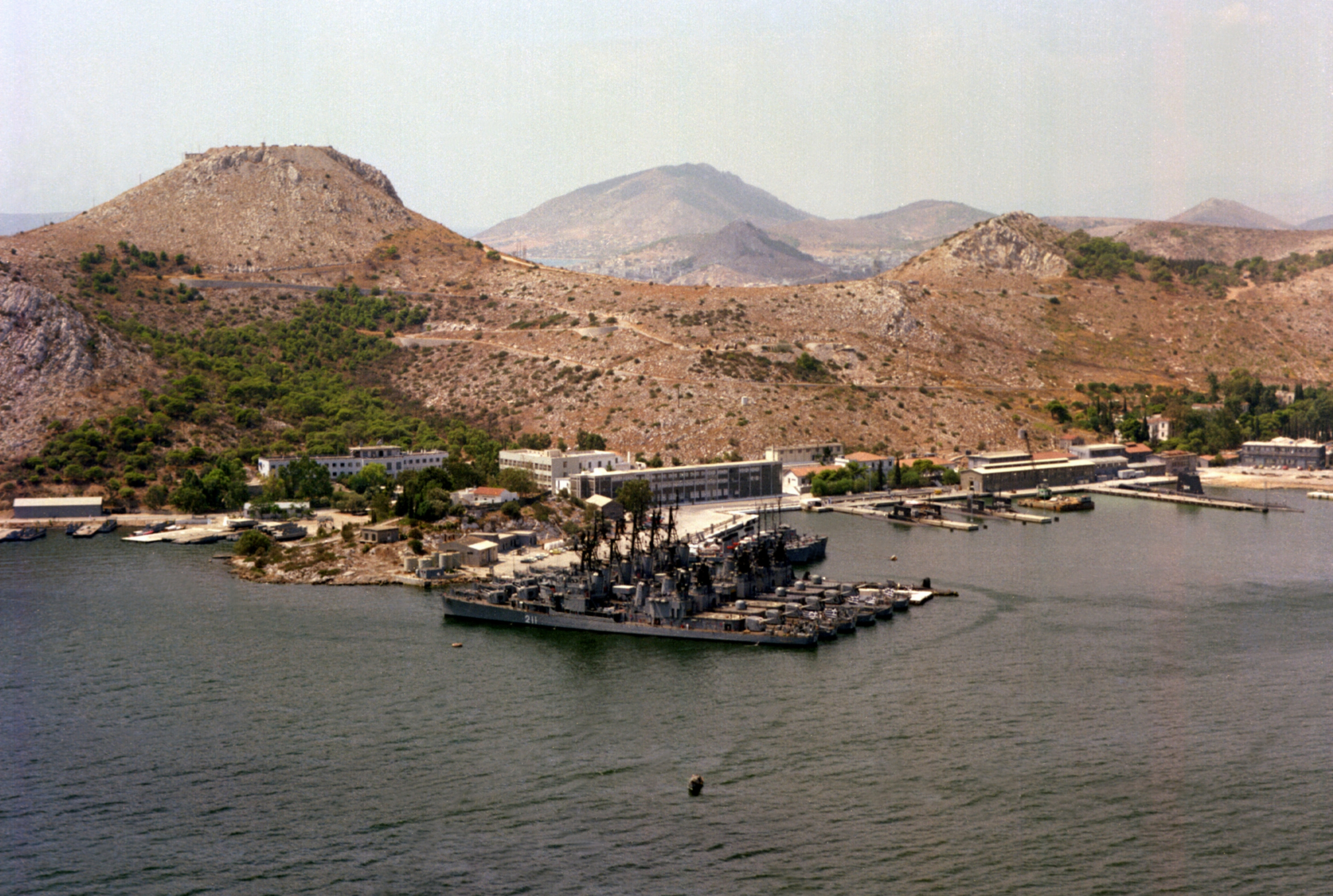
Salamis Naval Base administrative area (1979)

Salamis Naval Base belongs to the Hellenic Navy Logistics Command. It consists of the Headquarters and the following services:

- Ship movements, docks, jetties and base security
- Salamis Naval Hospital (ΝΝΣ)
- General procurement and supplies service (ΝΣ/ΔΕ)
- Fuel supply service (ΝΣ/ΔΚ)
- Naval infrastructure section (ΝΣ/ΔΝΕΡ)
- Naval weapons service (ΝΣ/ΔΝΟ)
- Chemical Laboratory (ΝΣ/ΔΝΧ)
- Financial section (ΝΣ/ΔΟΥ)
- Technical section (ΝΣ/ΔΤ)

The following commands of the Fleet Headquarters are also based within Salamis Naval Base:

- Hellenic Command Frigates
- Hellenic Command Fast Boats
- Hellenic Command Gun Boats
- Hellenic Command Mine Sweepers
- Hellenic Command Amphibious Forces
- Hellenic Command Submarines
- Underwater Demolition Command

Other naval units in the base area include:

- Palaskas Training Camp
- Amphiali Heliport, LGAM

In addition, the Forward Operating Naval Base of Syros is controlled by Salamis Naval Base.

== Relations with local communities ==
Salamis Naval Base has established close ties with the local community. The base is a major employer for the islanders and regularly subcontracts ship maintenance to local business establishments in Salamis, Perama, Keratsini and Drapetsona. In addition it provides the local community with health services (the islanders were served by the naval hospital), vocational training for the young, and reinforcement to the national and municipal emergency services (fire and ambulance).

== See also ==
- Hellenic Navy
- List of Greek military bases
