= Charalambos Delagrammatikas =

Naval Officer

Charalambos Delagrammatikas (Greek: Χαράλαμπος Δελαγραμμάτικας; 18 August 1887 – 17 September 1947) was a Hellenic Navy officer, who served briefly as Chief of the Hellenic Navy General Staff in April 1941.

== Life ==
Charalambos Delagrammatikas was born in Chalkis on 18 August 1887, the son of the army officer and future lieutenant general, Nikolaos Delagrammatikas.

He entered the Hellenic Naval Academy on 4 November 1902, and graduated as a line ensign of the Royal Hellenic Navy on 8 July 1906. In 1909 he participated in the Goudi coup, as well as the subsequent naval mutiny led by Konstantinos Typaldos-Alfonsatos. Promoted to sub-lieutenant on 28 February 1911, he was sent to France to receive training on submarines in 1912.

During the Balkan Wars of 1912–1913, Delagrammatikas initially served aboard the torpedo boat tender Kanaris, with which he participated in the capture of Agios Efstratios and the operations for the capture of Lesbos by the Greek fleet. In January 1913, he joined the crew of the submarine Delfin, whose captain he became later in the year, with the rank of lieutenant. On 3 November 1914 he was promoted to lieutenant first class (with date of promotion on 17 October).

During World War I Delagrammatikas served aboard the ironclad Hydra and the cruiser Elli. He also participated in the Southern Russia Intervention by the Allies, on board the battleship Kilkis, and in the Asia Minor Campaign, again on Hydra, and finally as captain of the torpedo boat Smyrni. He was promoted to lieutenant commander on 25 February 1920 (retroactive to 26 December 1917) and commander on 2 December 1920.

After the disastrous end of the Asia Minor Campaign and the 11 September 1922 Revolution, he was dismissed from active duty, before finally retiring in October 1923 with the rank of captain. His retirement did not last long, as he was restored to active service, with his prior rank of commander, by the dictatorship of Theodoros Pangalos on 24 July 1925. In 1926–1930 he led the Greek naval mission supervising the construction of the submarine Papanikolis (Y-2) and the subsequent Protefs class of submarines. In 1931 he captained the cruiser Elli. After studies in the Naval War School in 1931–1932, he served as commander of the Naval Academy in 1933–1935. Promoted to captain on 29 March 1934 and rear admiral on 30 December 1938, he served as commandant-general of the naval training establishments in 1935, of light craft in 1937, and of submarines in 1937–1939.

Delagrammatikas served as commandant of the Salamis Naval Base from 1939 and during the Greco-Italian War and the Battle of Greece. In April 1941, he briefly served as Chief of the Navy General Staff, shortly before Athens was captured by German troops. He remained in Greece during the Axis occupation of the country, serving in the Navy General Directorate of the collaborationist governments' Ministry of National Defence. After liberation, he was formally placed in retirement on 14 February 1945, but recalled to active service and promoted to vice admiral from 6 September 1946 to 2 May 1947. In addition, on 31 August 1946 he received the Greek War Cross, First Class and the Medal for Outstanding Acts for his role in preparing the submarine command for the war, and keeping the Salamis Naval Base operational during the 1940–41 conflict.

Vice Admiral Delagrammatikas died in Athens on 17 September 1947.
