= Greek submarine Delfin (1912) =

Greek submarine which served during the Balkan Wars and World War I

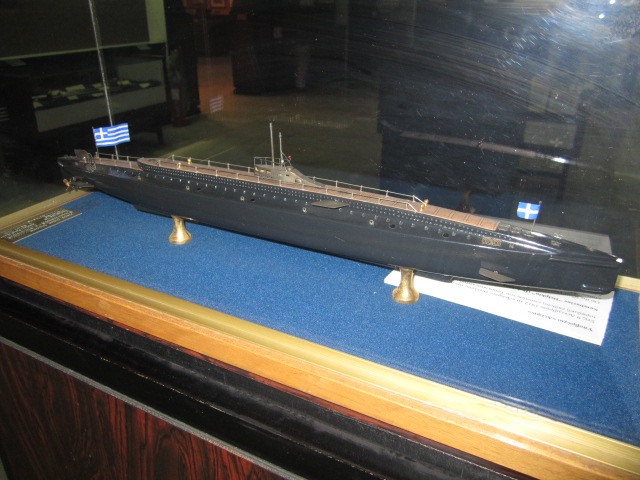
- A scale model of Delfin at the Athens War Museum

History

Greece
- Name: Delfin
- Namesake: Dolphin
- Ordered: September 1910
- Builder: Schneider Shipyards, Chalon-sur-Saône, France
- Laid down: 1911
- Launched: 1912
- Commissioned: 9 August 1912
- Decommissioned: 1920
- Fate: Scrapped

General characteristics
- Type: Submarine
- Displacement: Surfaced: 310 tons; Submerged: 460 tons
- Length: 47.10 meters (154 ft 6 in)
- Beam: 4.7 m (15 ft)
- Draft: 2.85 meters (9 ft 4 in)
- Installed power: 2 × diesel engines, surfaced; 2 × electric motors, submerged
- Propulsion: 2 × propellers
- Speed: Surfaced: 13 knots (24 km/h); Submerged: 8.5 knots (15.7 km/h)
- Range: 1,800 nmi (3,300 km; 2,100 mi) (surfaced); 48.8 nmi (90.4 km; 56.2 mi) at 4.5 knots (8.3 km/h; 5.2 mph) (submerged)
- Test depth: 36 m (118 ft)
- Complement: 19
- Armament: 1 × 450 mm (17.7 in) internal torpedo tube; 4 x Drzewiecki drop collars; 6 x torpedoes

Delfin (Greek: Δελφίν, "dolphin") was a submarine built for the Greek Navy in 1911. She served during the Balkan Wars, earning the distinction of being the first submarine in the world to conduct offensive patrols and launch a submerged torpedo attack (albeit without success) against a warship.

In 1916, she was seized by the Entente during the Greek National Schism. The lack of proper maintenance during the period of her confiscation led to serious structural damage. Her poor condition meant that she saw little service until her decommissioning and eventual scrapping in early 1920.

== Design and description ==
The submarine displaced 310 metric tons (310 long tons) surfaced and 460 metric tons (450 long tons) submerged. She measured 47.10 meters (154 ft 6 in) between perpendiculars, had a beam of 4.7 meters (15 ft 5 in) and a draft of 2.85 meters (9 ft 4 in). Delfin had an operational diving depth of 18 m (59 ft) and a maximum diving depth of 36 m (118 ft). Her complement consisted of 19 men.

Her hull was divided into seven compartments and she was fitted with seven external ballast tanks. The small depth of the flood port in the stern ballast tank meant that it took longer to fill; it was therefore always filled first. Diving was performed with great caution to prevent an excessive negative inclination from the inflow of water in the ballast tanks. Her rudder was manually controlled from the central compartment and the conning tower. She had two electrical periscopes, the stern periscope was operated from the central compartment while the bow periscope was controlled from the conning tower. Neither of which could modify their magnification or make observations above the line of the horizon. Delfin had three sets of diving planes, the bow and stern ones were below the waterline, while the middle one was above the waterline. Schneider-Laubeuf type submarines had high levels of buoyancy (30-35%) and a complete external hull which protected the pressure hull.

For surface running, the boat was powered by two Schneider-Carels diesel engines which were heated by compressed air for 10-15 minutes by their corresponding two electric motors before starting. The electric motors used 94-cell batteries. The fuel used was gasoline bordering on paraffin. When submerged the two propellers were driven by two Schneider electric motor using electricity from two 192-cell batteries. Delfin could reach 13 knots (24 km/h; 15 mph) on the surface and 8.5 knots (15.7 km/h; 9.8 mph) underwater. On the surface, the boat had a range of 1,800 nmi (3,300 km; 2,100 mi), submerged, she had a range of 48.8 nmi (90.4 km; 56.2 mi) at 4.5 knots (8.3 km/h; 5.2 mph).

She was armed with one internal 450 mm (17.7 in) torpedo tube in the bow and four Drzewiecki drop collars (two in the bow and two in the stern). She bore six Schwartzkopff type 450 mm (17.7 in) torpedoes, one in the torpedo tube, one in each collar and one stored in the bow compartment.

== Construction and service ==
=== Construction and delivery ===
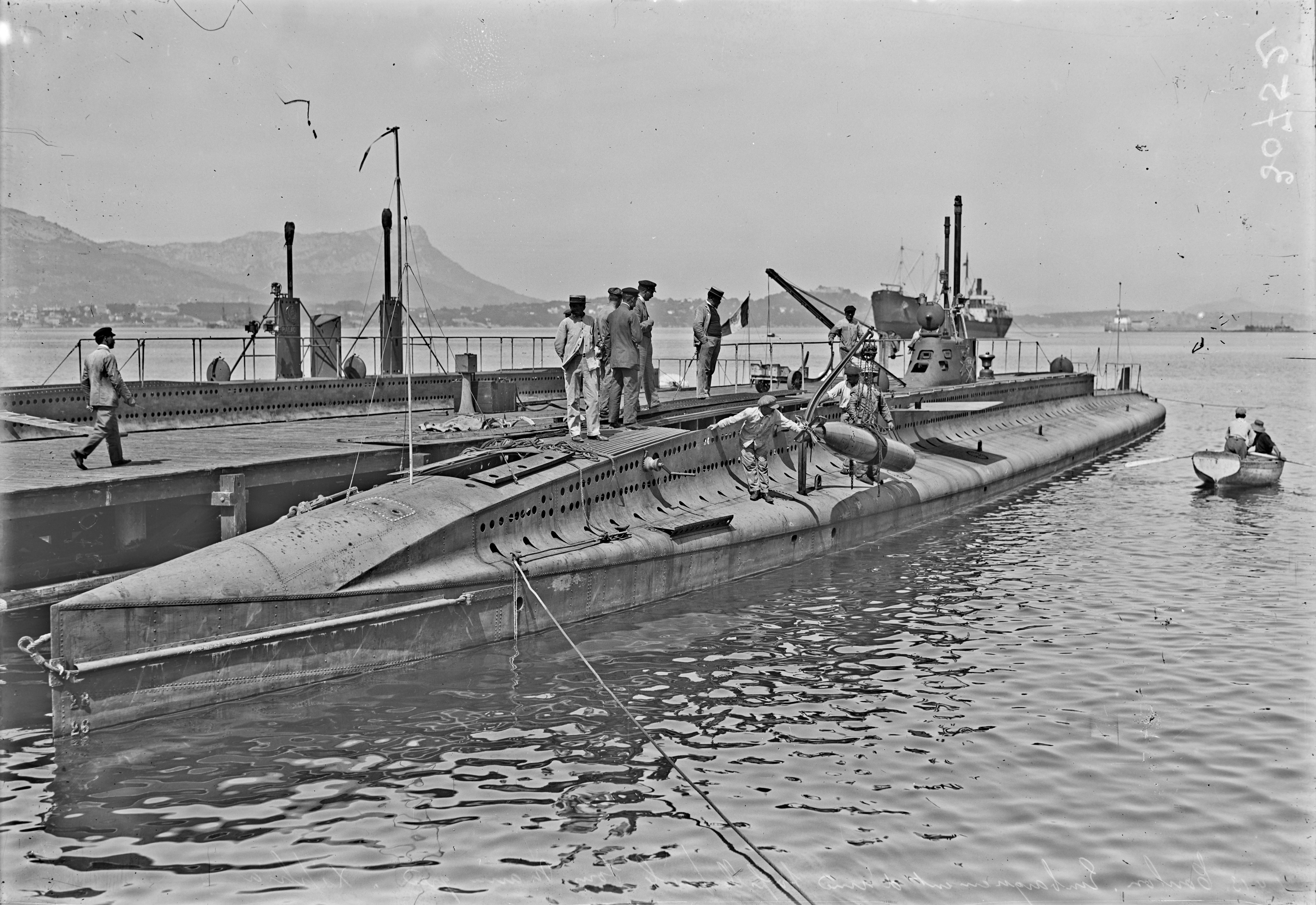
A torpedo being loaded into Xifias at Toulon

The Hellenic Navy underwent a major reorganization and rearmament in the aftermath of the 1909 Goudi coup. The putschists pressured the Greek government into ordering submersibles (as submarines were known at the time). Thus submersible Delfin and her sister ship Xifias were ordered from the Schneider Shipyards at Chalon-sur-Saône, France in September 1910. Delfin was named after Greek word for dolphin. Construction of Delfin had begun in early 1909, before the Greek order was placed, based on the design of naval architect Maxime Laubeuf.

Construction was completed on 11 November 1911; limited trials were conducted at the port as installation of the ship's equipment continued. The early trials were supervised by Lieutenant Commander Stefanos Paparrigopoulos and seven other Greek officers. Basic trials and equipment installation was completed on 11 January 1912, Delfin was then transported by barges to the Schneider trial station at St. Mandrier, near Toulon. Considerable delays in carrying out sea trials and equipment checks led to the postponement of the commissioning until 9 August 1912. A few days later maximum depth trials were performed with the ship diving to 36 m (118 ft). During the course of August and September the ship's crew underwent intense training under the guidance of French officers specializing in submersibles. Most of the training dives took place on a French submarine rather than Delfin itself. As tensions between Greece and the Ottoman Empire escalated the decision was taken for Delfin to depart for Greece before her crew's training had been completed. Delfin sailed on 29 September, travelling on the surface and unescorted and arrived at Corfu on 4 October to repair damage to her left engine. She reached her destination the Port of Piraeus the following day, where she was welcomed by the commander of the British naval mission, Rear Admiral Lionel Grant Tufnell, the Minister of Naval Affairs Nikolaos Stratos and the Finance Minister Alexandros Diomidis. The same day Greece declared war against the Ottomans, joining the rest of the Balkan League in the First Balkan War. This unescorted, non-stop journey of 1,100 miles (1,800 km) 1,100 miles set a world record and confirmed the abilities of her crew, despite their limited training. However, it also meant that no reserve crew could be trained, limiting her battle effectiveness due to the crew's fatigue. Moreover the Salamis Naval Base did not have the necessary technical facilities to service this new type of ship. It possessed neither specialized workshops nor separate power generators and compressors to address the needs of the ships. Delfin was the first submarine to enter the service of the Greek navy. Nordenfelt I which had been ordered in 1884, had disappointed the Greek authorities during its trials in early 1886 and its purchase was subsequently cancelled. Its hull was abandoned in Piraeus.

=== Balkan Wars ===
On 19 October, Delfin departed from Salamis and sailed parallel to Euboea towards the island of Skiathos. In Skiathos she was joined by the merchant ship Kanaris which was supposed to serve as the submarine's refueling ship but in reality she had no such capabilities. Delphin's crew thus simply slept on Kanaris. Following the Capture of Lemnos, the Greek fleet relocated to Moudros Bay. At Moudros, Delfin's crew underwent intensive training dives and carried out regular equipment inspections, but no combat training was possible due to logistical constraints. On 20 November, Delfin was transferred to Tenedos. A day later she began daily conducting daylight offensive patrols (both submerged and on the surface) at a distance of 4,000–6,000 meters (13,000–20,000 ft) from the Ottoman forts guarding the entrance to the Dardanelles. Those were the first offensive patrols in the history of submarine warfare. At night Delfin anchored at Tenedos where her crew rested and carried out maintenance works.

The patrols were uneventful, until December when the Ottomans decided to intensify their naval operations, in view of the failed peace negotiations with Greece. On the morning of 1 December, an Ottoman destroyer emerged from the straits and was engaged by two Greek ships. However, the commander of the destroyers, Captain Ioannis Vratsanos, initially ordered Delfin to remain in port. At 13:26 p.m. Delfin's captain, Stefanos Paparrigopoulos, was informed that the Ottoman light cruiser Mecidiye had appeared in front of the straits. The submarine departed Tenedos at 13:26 p.m. and dove 12 minutes later, but arrived too late to intercept Mecidiye. On 3 December, the submarine was conducting an early morning patrol, at 8:10 a.m. she received information that the Ottomans began assembling in front of the Dardanelles. By 8:50 a.m. the entire Ottoman fleet appeared in front of the straits. Once again Delfin was ordered to stand by; at 9:22 a.m. the Ottomans opened fire marking the beginning of the Battle of Elli. Two minutes earlier, the submerged Delfin had begun to approach the enemy, but strong adverse currents prevented Delfin from engaging the enemy before the Ottomans retreated at full speed after a brief engagement. Paparrigopoulos sent a second strongly worded complaint to the fleet commander, Pavlos Kountouriotis, explaining that the stand by orders had made the submarine's successful operation impossible. On 5 December, Kountouriotis granted him complete freedom of action.

On the morning of 9 December, Delfin was approaching the port of Tenedos in order to charge her batteries when she received information that Mecidiye and five Ottoman destroyers had been spotted outside the straits. Despite the fact that the batteries were at half of their capacity, Delfin sailed at full speed towards the island of Mavria and halted there. At 9:05 a.m. she was notified that the Ottoman ships had been seen off the western tip of Imbros. She submerged at 9:52 a.m., but the submarine's bow took on a dangerous down angle of at least 20 degrees during the dive and blowing of all her ballast tanks brought her back to the surface. Paparrigopoulos then ordered a dive to periscope depth which was carried out successfully. Delfin spotted Mecidiye, the cruiser Berk-i Satvet and four destroyers sailing between the submarine and Tenedos. Delfin manoeuvered to position herself for the attack and was able to approach the Ottoman ships undetected. At either 10:30 a.m. or 10:40 a.m., Delfin fired her bow torpedo at Mecidiye at a distance of either 800 metres (2,600 ft) or 500 metres (1,600 ft). The torpedo made some jumps on the surface and disappeared from view, presumably having sunk without impacting its target. This marked the first submerged torpedo attack in naval history. The splash of the ejection and the torpedo itself was spotted by the Ottomans, who maneuvered their ships towards Delfin at full speed. She dove to 18 metres (59 ft) and turned away from the enemy. At 10:55 a.m. she returned to periscope depth having evaded her pursuers.

At 11:40 a.m., the submarine ran aground on the Shimal reef north of Tenedos. Having failed to blown her ballast tanks empty with the remaining small volume of air, Paparrigopoulos decided to drop her ballast weights which enabled her to resurface. Delfin returned to the Bay of Mudros and after two days sailed for the Salamis Naval Base. She took no further part in offensive military operations during the war, as she was unable to submerge without her lead ballast. There she was placed in a dry dock and refitted with new lead ballast weights. In January 1913, Delfin began patrolling the Saronic Gulf in order to protect military transport ships from a possible attack by the Ottoman cruiser Hamidiye. Those lasted until spring, when Hamidiye departed for the Red Sea.

=== Later service ===
During the course of World War I, Greece was affected by the National Schism political crisis. The crux of the dispute was on whether the country should remain neutral or join the war on the side of the Entente. The Entente intervened into Greek affairs numerous times in an effort to support the pro-war Provisional Government of National Defence, including a blockade of Piraeus and the Salamis Naval Base.

On 28 September 1916, two steamboats from the British battleship HMS Duncan towed Delfin to Adamantas on the island of Milos where the submarine was placed under the supervision of the French Navy. The submersible remained at Adamantas until September 1917, when she was towed back to Salamis Naval Base and officially returned back to the Greek Navy on 14 October. During the period of her captivity she remained exposed to the elements and received no maintenance. As a result, the condition of her equipment had deteriorated, while her battery plates had been irreparably damaged. New plates were ordered from France, but those arrived only at the end of the year and many bore traces of sea water contamination. Systematic repairs of the plates led to the assembly of a single battery which was placed on Xifias. In April 1919, the battery was removed from Xifias and placed into Delfin after the steel plates of the former's hull began detaching. Delfin resumed operation on 20 May and remained in service until 23 July 1919, when maneuvers were halted due to the corrosion of the ballast tanks.

The poor condition of the hulls and ballast tanks of the submersibles along with the absence of radios and gyrocompasses led to their decommissioning in early 1920. One of the periscopes and some of the electric motors were used for training purposes in the Hellenic Naval Academy, while the pressure hulls were sold to the Port of Piraeus Authority.

== Commanders ==
The submarine was commanded by the following officers:

- Lieutenant Commander Stefanos Paparrigopoulos (21 August 1912 – 18 June 1913)
- Lieutenant Charalambos Delagrammatikas (18 June 1913 – 1 July 1913)
- Lieutenant Ioannis Giannikostas (1 July 1913 – 3 April 1914)
- Lieutenant Dedes Dedes (June 1914 – March 1915)
- Lieutenant Grigorios Mezeviris (March 1915 – July 1915)
- Lieutenant Dedes Dedes (July 1915 – 28 September 1916)
- Taken over by the French (28 September 1916 – 14 October 1917)
- Lieutenant Panagiotis Vandoros (April 1919 – 23 July 1919)
- Lieutenant Commander Grigorios Mezeviris (23 July 1919 – 1920)

== Bibliography ==
- Dimitrakopoulos, Anastasios (2015). Ιστορία του Πολεμικού Ναυτικού, 1874-1912 [History of the Greek Navy, 1874-1912] (in Greek). Vol. II. Hellenic Maritime Museum. ISBN 9786188218109.
- Fontenoy, Paul E. (2007). Submarines. Weapons and Warfare: An Illustrated History of Their Impact. ABC-CLIO. ISBN 9781851095681.
- Fotakis, Zisis (2005). Greek naval strategy and policy, 1910–1919. Routledge. ISBN 9780415350143.
- Langensiepen, Bernd; Güleryüz, Ahmet (1995). The Ottoman Steam Navy, 1828–1923. Conway Maritime Press. ISBN 0851776108.
- Massouras, Timotheos G.; Katopodis, Thomas P. (2010). Hellenic Submarines. Vol. I. Hellenic Maritime Museum. ISBN 9789608853584.
- Paizis-Paradelis, Konstantinos (1979). Τά πλοία τοῦ Ἑλληνικοῦ Πολεμικοῦ Ναυτικοῦ 1830-1979 [Ships of the Greek Navy 1830-1979] (in Greek). Hellenic Navy General Staff.
- Sondhaus, Lawrence (2001). Naval Warfare, 1815-1914. Routledge. ISBN 0415214785.
