= Katsonis-class submarine =

Class overview
- Name: Katsonis class
- Builders: Chantiers de la Gironde shipyard; Chantiers de la Loire shipyard
- Operators: Hellenic Navy
- Preceded by: Delfin class
- Succeeded by: Protefs class
- Built: 1925–1927
- In commission: 1927–1945
- Completed: 2
- Lost: 1
- Retired: 1

General characteristics
- Type: Submarine
- Displacement: surfaced: 576 tons; submerged: 775 tons
- Length: 62.5 m (205 ft)
- Beam: 5.3 m (17 ft)
- Draft: 3.6 m (12 ft)
- Propulsion: one two-shaft Schneider-Carels diesel engine; two electric engine motors; 1,300 bhp, 1,000 shp
- Speed: surfaced: 14 kn (26 km/h; 16 mph); submerged: 9.5 kn (17.6 km/h; 10.9 mph)
- Range: 3,500 nmi (6,500 km; 4,000 mi) surfaced @ 10 kn (19 km/h; 12 mph)
- Endurance: 100 nmi (190 km; 120 mi) submerged @ 5 kn (9.3 km/h; 5.8 mph)
- Test depth: 260 ft (80 m)
- Complement: 30
- Armament: 2 × 21-inch (533 mm) internal bow T/T, 2 × 21-inch (533 mm) external bow T/T, 2 × 21-inch (533 mm) external stern T/T; 1 × 100 mm gun, 2 MGs

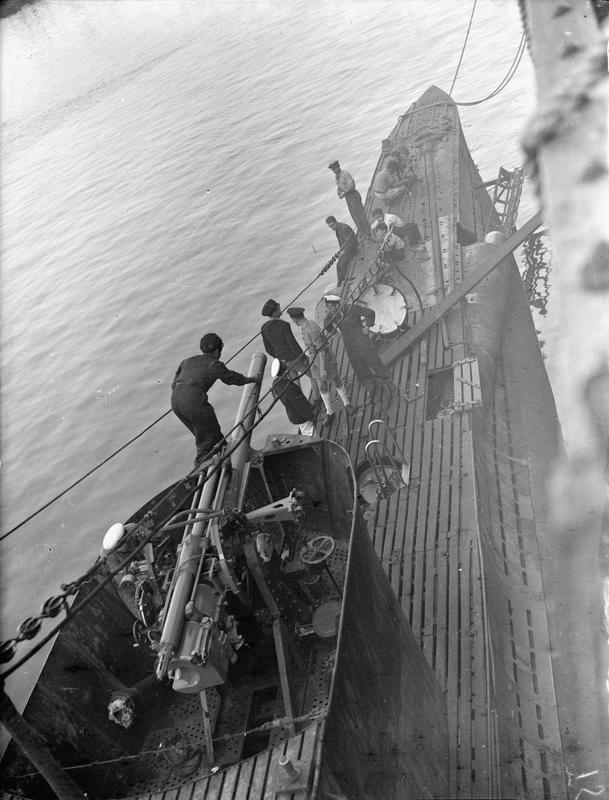
Painting of guns on board the Greek submarine, Papanicolis, in Beirut, Syria in 1942

The Katsonis class was a French-built class of two submarines for the Hellenic Navy, serving from 1927–28 until the Second World War. The ships of the class were the first new submarines acquired by Greece after the First World War.

== Appearance and characteristics ==
In general, they were similar to the French Navy's Circé-class submarines, of Schneider-Laubeuf design, but the conning tower was larger in order to accommodate the rotating platform of the 100 mm gun.

== Ships ==
Katsonis class submarines
Name	Pennant number	Builder	Launched	Commissioned	Fate
Katsonis	Y-1	Chantiers de la Gironde	20 March 1926	8 June 1928	Sunk by a German submarine chaser on 14 September 1943.
Papanikolis	Y-2	Chantiers de la Loire	19 November 1926	21 December 1927	Decommissioned in 1945 and later scrapped. Its conning tower has been preserved, and is exhibited at the Hellenic Maritime Museum.
