= Iatridis =

Iatridis is a surname. Notable people with the surname include:

- Georgios Iatridis (fl. 1896), Greek fencer
- Miltiadis Iatridis (1906–1960), Greek naval officer
