= Nikolaos Delagrammatikas =

- Νικόλαος Δελαγραμμάτικας
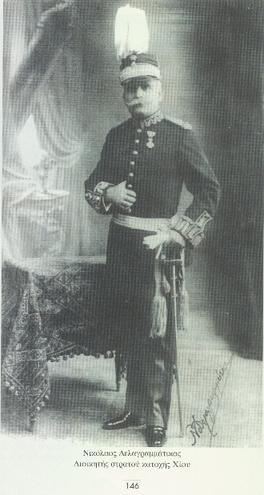
- Nikolaos Delagrammatikas in uniform.
- Born: c. 1853; Chalkis, Kingdom of Greece
- Died: 1938; Athens, Kingdom of Greece
- Military career
- Allegiance: Kingdom of Greece
- Branch: Hellenic Army
- Service years: 1870–1916
- Rank: Lieutenant General
- Commands: 7th Infantry Regiment; 8th Infantry Division; 6th Infantry Division
- Conflicts: Epirus Revolt (1878); Battle of Gribovo; Greco-Turkish War (1897); Battle of Velestino; Balkan Wars; First Balkan War; Liberation of Chios; Battle of Bizani; Second Balkan War
- Awards: Order of the Redeemer

Nikolaos Delagrammatikas (Greek: Νικόλαος Δελαγραμμάτικας, born c. 1853) was a senior Hellenic Army officer who fought in the Greco-Turkish War of 1897 and the Balkan Wars of 1912–1913.

He was born in Chalkis in about 1853, and enlisted in the Hellenic Army as an NCO. In 1878, as a sergeant, he fought in the cross-border incursion into Ottoman territory that resulted in the battle of Gribovo, and again in the border skirmishes of 1886, this time as a Second Lieutenant.

During the 1897 war he was a captain, and distinguished himself through his bravery in the Battle of Velestino, earning a field promotion. On the outbreak of the First Balkan War, he commanded the 7th Infantry Regiment within the Army of Thessaly. Following the capture of Thessaloniki, he led a mixed force of regular and irregular forces to the capture of the island of Chios, which he accomplished against strong opposition by the Ottoman garrison. After the capture of Chios, he and his men were transferred to the Epirus sector, where he led one of the attack columns during the capture of Ioannina. He subsequently served as CO of the 8th Infantry Division and then of the 6th Infantry Division, which he led during the Second Balkan War. He retired on 16 December 1916 with the rank of lieutenant general.

He is the father of Vice Admiral Charalambos Delagrammatikas (1876–1947).
