= Greek submarine Xifias =

Greek submarine Xifias ("swordfish") can refer to two ships of the Hellenic Navy:

- Greek submarine Xifias (1913), French-built submarine, in service 1913–1920
- Greek submarine Xifias (Υ-10) or Xiphias, the former British HMS Untiring, in Greek service 1945–1952
