= Roussen-class fast attack craft =

Class of European naval vessels

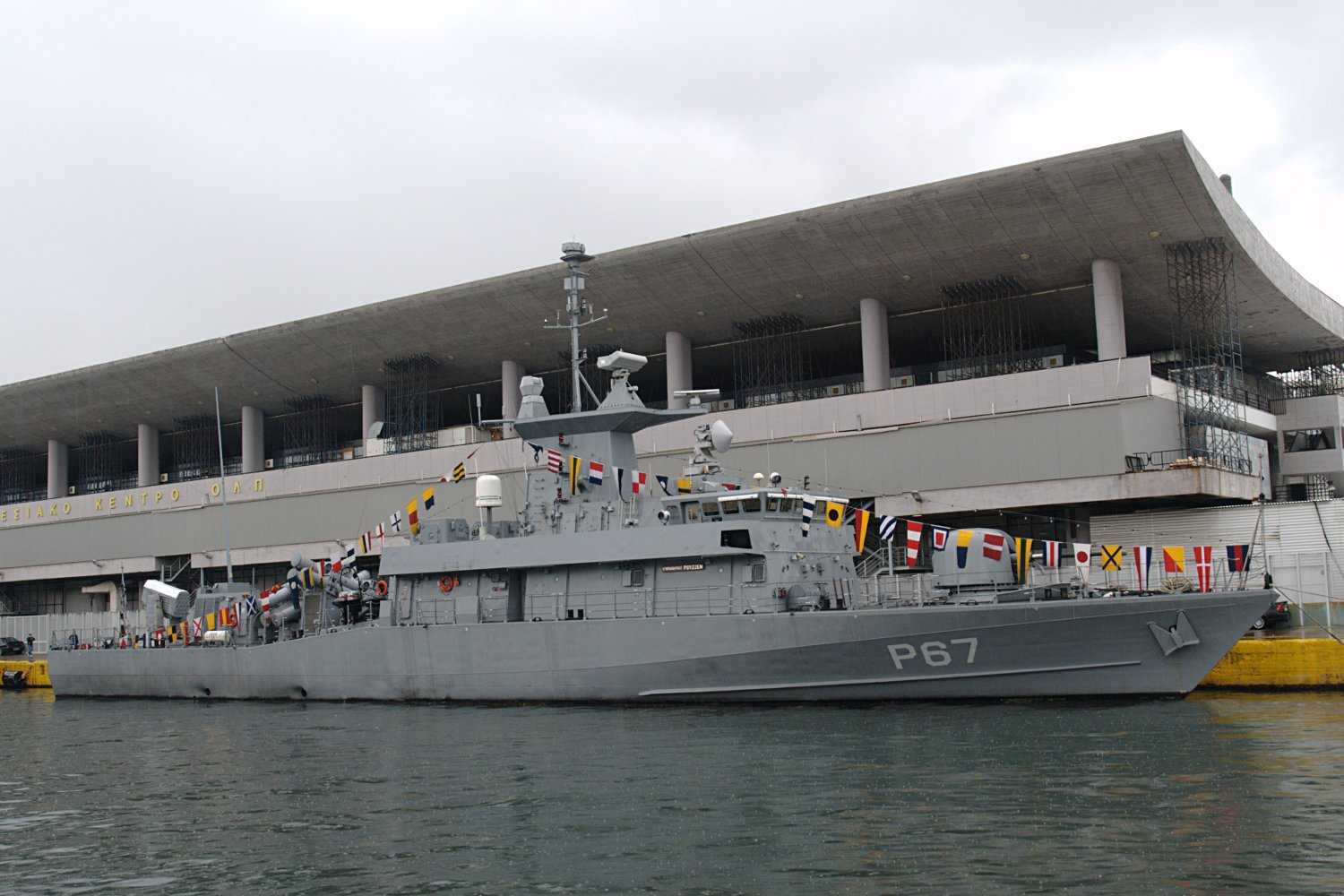
- HS Roussen, P-67 in Piraeus during Saint Nicholas festival of 2009.

Class overview
- Name: Roussen, Super Vita
- Builders: Elefsis Shipyards; BAE Systems Surface Ships
- Operators: Hellenic Navy
- Preceded by: La Combattante IIIb
- In commission: 2005 - present day
- Planned: 7
- Completed: 7
- Active: 7

General characteristics
- Type: FACM
- Displacement: 580 tons / 668 tons fully loaded
- Length: 62 m
- Beam: 9.5 m
- Draught: 2.6 m
- Propulsion: 4 × MTU 16V595 TE90 diesel engines 23,500 hp
- Speed: 35 knots (65 km/h; 40 mph)
- Complement: 45
- Sensors & processing systems: Thales MW08 3D G-band surveillance radar; Thales Mirador electro-optical target tracker; Thales Scout MkII low probability of intercept radar; Sperry Marine Bridgemaster-E navigation radar; Tacticos combat management system; Aeromaritime IFF Mk12; ICS 2000 integrated communications system
- Electronic warfare & decoys: DR 3000 ESM system; 1 SRBOC decoy launcher
- Armament: 1 × Oto Melara 76 mm/62 cal.; 8 × MM40 Block 2/3 anti-ship missiles; 1 × Mk31 21-cell launcher of RAM Block 1 surface-to-air missiles; 2 × Oto Melara 30mm cannons

The Roussen class is a seven-strong class of British-designed fast attack missile boats improved and customized for the Hellenic Navy, also known as Super Vita. The class is named after its lead ship, which in turn is named after Lt Nikolaos Roussen, a World War II submarines officer who was killed in the suppression of the Navy mutiny in April 1944.

== History ==
The modernization program of the Hellenic Navy in the late 1990s included the construction of three modern missile boats and was signed in January 2000. The construction took place at the Elefsis Shipyards, while Vosper Thornycroft (now BAE Systems Surface Ships) provided the necessary design, logistical support and equipment for the ships. In August 2003 and September 2008 options that provided for the acquisition of four more vessels were taken up with the last ship to be commissioned in 2015.

On 25 September 2008, a 299 million Euro contract was signed between the Greek State and the Elefsis Shipyards for the construction of the two remaining vessels of the class, P-78 and P-79. According to the contract, the delivery times of the two FACs were 46 months from the start of the contract for the first ship and 52 months for the second. Due to serious financial problems of the shipyards and the Greek state, there has been a 10 year delay in the construction of the two ships. In 2016 the Greek government decided that the Hellenic Navy should undertake the completion of the construction of the two vessels. The plan was that the two vessels should have been launched not later then 18 months after the signing of the contract and that they should have been delivered in the navy not later then 2019. In 2017, in a statement of Deputy Defense Minister D. Vitsas there were hopes that the construction would have finished in mid 2018. Finally, on 1 June 2018, the launch of the 6th Super Vita P-78 took place at the Elefsina Shipyards. With a ceremony held on 28 July 2020, the 6th vessel was officially commissioned into the Hellenic Navy. The 7th vessel was launched on 5 August 2020 and commissioned on 29 September 2022. An eighth ship was revealed in January 2021. Although there hasn't been an order yet.

In September 2020, the UK offered to build eight boats of the same design for Ukraine.

== Design ==
The plans of the Roussen Class missile boats are based on smaller Vita class boats serving in the navies of Qatar (Barzan-class FAC), as well as similar size vessels built for Oman and other countries. The hull is made of steel and the superstructure is made of aluminum, while the company Vosper Thornycroft (now BAE Systems Surface Ships) provides the electricity transmission system, the management board, electrical equipment and systems countermeasures.

== Weapons and electronics ==
The main armament of the ships are eight Exocet MM40 Block II/III anti-ship missiles with a range of up to 70/180 km respectively. They are complemented by an Otobreda 76 mm naval gun in the bow and two smaller 30mm cannons as secondary weapons located on the ships' superstructure. The vessel's primary anti-air and anti-missile weapon is the RIM-116 Block 1A RAM missile system which comprises an onboard Mk-31 launcher with 21 projectiles, as well as the DR3000SLW electronic support measures system and the Mk36 SRBOC decoy launcher.

The sensor suite responsible for the timely identification and homing of surface and air targets includes the MW08 3D G-band surveillance radar, the Mirador electro-optical target tracker and the Scout MkII low probability of intercept radar which is being controlled by the TACTICOS combat management system.

== Ships ==
The ships of this class are named after junior officers of the Hellenic Navy who have been killed in action. They are:

Pennant number	Greek name	Transliterated name	Namesake	Builder	Launched	Commissioned	Status
P 67	Υποπλοίαρχος Ρουσσέν	Ypoploiarchos Roussen	Lieutenant Nikolaos Roussen, killed during the suppression of the naval mutiny of 1944.	Elefsis Shipyards	12 November 2002	20 December 2005	In service (2020)
P 68	Υποπλοίαρχος Δανιόλος	Ypoploiarchos Daniolos	Lieutenant Antonios Daniolos, executive officer of the submarine Triton, killed when the ship was sunk by the Germans on 16 November 1942	Elefsis Shipyards	8 July 2003	22 February 2006	In service (2020)
P 69	Υποπλοίαρχος Κρυσταλλίδης	Ypoploiarchos Krystallidis	Lieutenant Vyron Kristallidis, crew member of the auxiliary ship Pleias, killed when the ship was sunk by the Germans on 22 April 1941	Elefsis Shipyards	6 April 2004	8 May 2006	In service (2020)
P 70	Υποπλοίαρχος Γρηγορόπουλος	Ypoploiarchos Grigoropoulos	Lieutenant Michail Grigoropoulos, executive officer of the destroyer Vasilissa Olga, killed when the ship was sunk by the Germans on 26 September 1943	Elefsis Shipyards	20 December 2005	1 October 2010	In service (2020)
P 71	Υποπλοίαρχος Ρίτσος	Ypoploiarchos Ritsos	Lieutenant Nikolaos Ritsos, killed on 16 November 1912 as commander of a naval infantry company during the capture of Chios from the Ottomans	Elefsis Shipyards	6 October 2006	10 January 2015	In service (2025)
P 78	Υποπλοίαρχος Καραθανάσης	Ypoploiarchos Karathanasis	Lieutenant Christodoulos Karathanasis, killed on 31 January 1996, during the Imia crisis, when the AB 212 helicopter PN 21 crashed into the sea	Elefsis Shipyards	1 June 2018	28 July 2020	In service (2020)
P 79	Υποπλοίαρχος Βλαχάκος	Ypoploiarchos Vlachakos	Lieutenant Panagiotis Vlachakos, killed on 31 January 1996, during the Imia crisis, when the AB 212 helicopter PN 21 crashed into the sea	Elefsis Shipyards	5 August 2020	29 September 2022	In service (2022)

== Similar ships ==
- Sa'ar 4.5-class missile boat
- Houbei class missile boat
- Skjold class patrol boat
- Hamina class missile boat

== Gallery ==
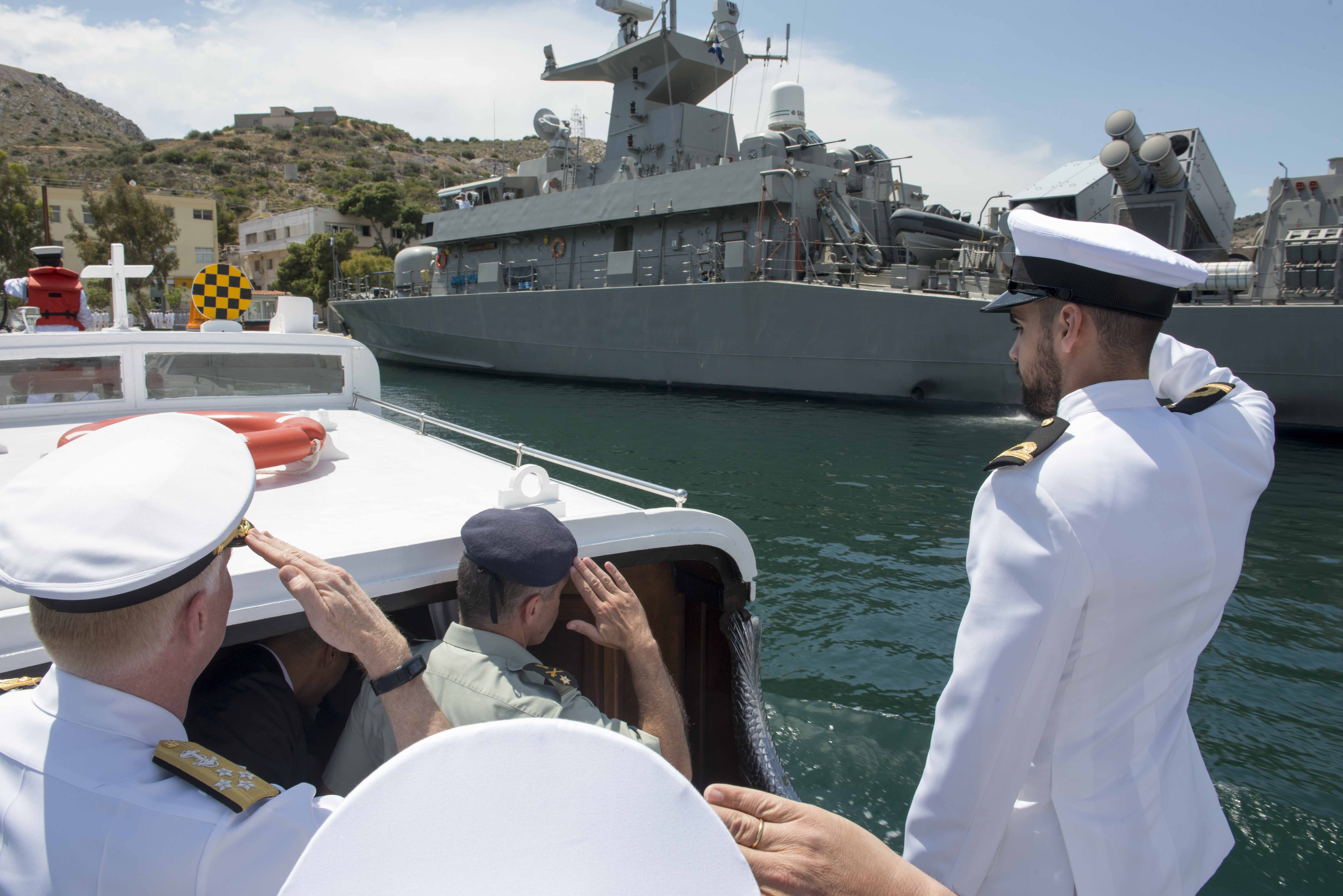
Adm. James G. Foggo III, commander, U.S. Naval Forces Europe-Africa and commander, Allied Joint Force Command Naples, Italy, returns a salute from crewmembers aboard Hellenic Navy Roussen-class fast attack craft HS P-71 Ritsos as he arrives at a Salamis Naval Base in Greece, May 10, 2018

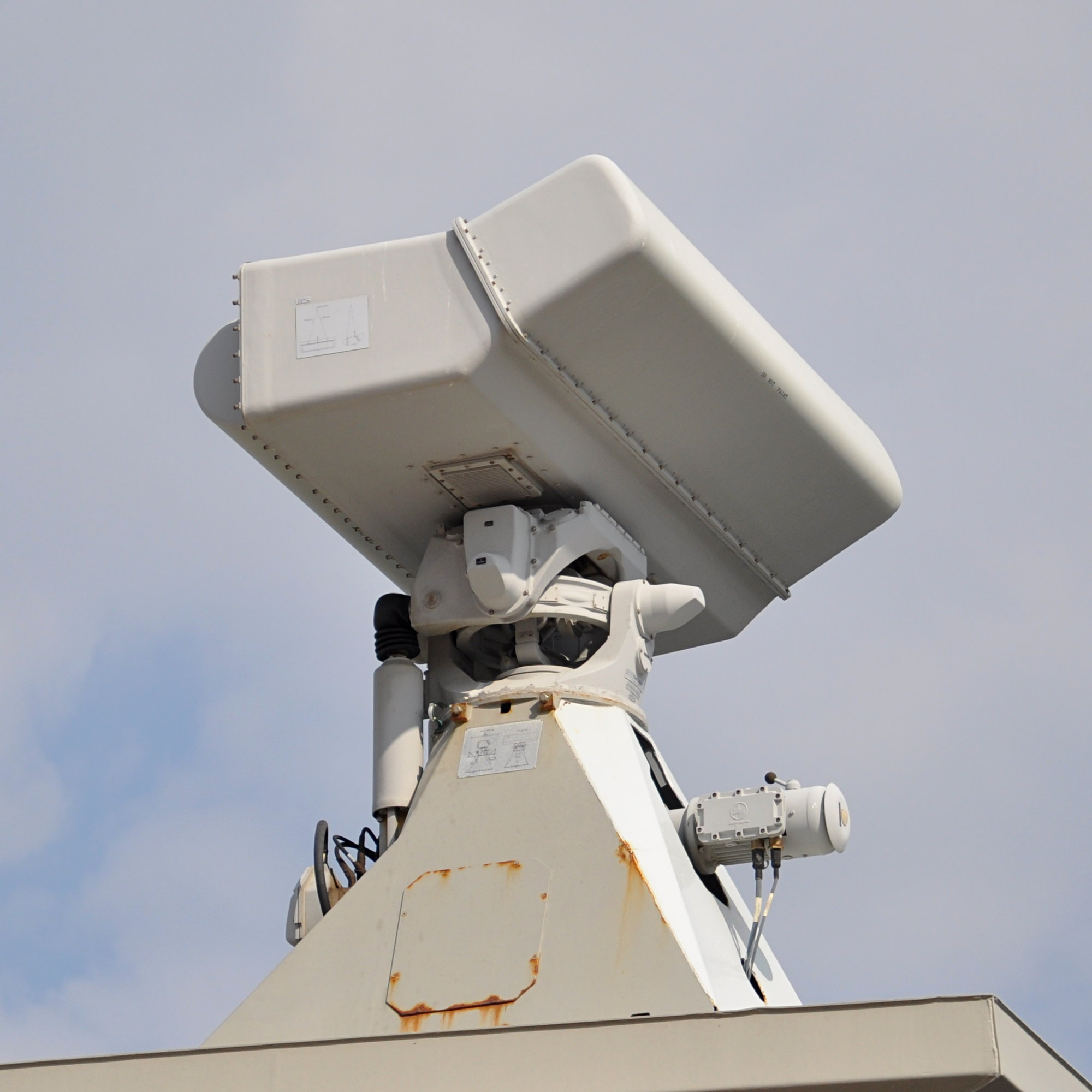
The MW-08 radar of Roussen-class HS Ritsos.

== Sources ==
- "Roussen Class (62m Super Vita) Fast Attack Missile Craft, Greece". Naval-Technology.com. SPG Media Limited.
- Wertheim, Eric (2007). The Naval Institute Guide to Combat Fleets of the World: Their Ships, Aircraft, and Systems. Naval Institute Press. p. 267. ISBN 9781591149552.
