= Nikolaos Roussen =

- Nikolaos Roussen
- Born: 25 April 1913; Athens, Greece
- Died: 22 April 1944 (aged 30); Alexandria, Egypt
- Military career
- Allegiance: Greece
- Branch: Royal Hellenic Navy
- Service years: 1929–1944
- Rank: Captain (posthumously)
- Unit: Katsonis (Υ-1)
- Commands: Papanikolis (Υ-2)
- Conflicts: World War II

Nikolaos Roussen (Greek: Νικόλαος Ρουσσέν, 1913–1944) was a Greek naval officer who distinguished himself during World War II. He served in the two most successful Greek submarines of the war as executive officer and captain. He died during the suppression of the Navy mutiny in April 1944.

== Life ==
Roussen was born in Athens on 25 April 1913. After completing his studies in the Hellenic Naval Academy in 1929-1933, he was commissioned as ensign. His first command was the torpedo boat Doris (1936–1937). He was subsequently promoted to sub-lieutenant and entered the Submarine School. During the Greco-Italian War, he served in the submarine Katsonis. In December 1940, he was promoted to Lieutenant. Following the German invasion and capitulation of the Army, the surviving ships of the fleet fled to Alexandria in Egypt. In the Middle East, he served aboard the armoured cruiser Averof before returning to the Katsonis as its XO.

On 10 October 1942, Roussen was assigned as captain of Katsonis' sister vessel, the submarine Papanikolis. With this vessel, Roussen operated in the Eastern Mediterranean and the Aegean Sea, scoring a number of successes. On 30 November, Papanikolis successfully ambushed and sank an 8,000-ton cargo vessel at the Alimnia islet, near Rhodes, and on subsequent patrols in January, March and May, she captured two large schooners and sank further five.

In early 1944, political tensions grew both in occupied Greece and in the Greek Armed Forces in the Middle East. As liberation drew nearer, the simmering conflict between the country's dominant resistance group, the Communist-controlled National Liberation Front (EAM), with the conservative sections of Greek society, and with the royalist Greek government in exile, erupted. In April 1944, pro-EAM demonstrations took place in several Greek units in Egypt, and the majority of the Navy's ships were commandeered by their crews. In order to quell this mutiny, the government formed special boarding detachments of reliable officers. Thus, on 22 April 1944, while leading his detachment to recover the corvette Apostolis, Roussen was mortally wounded. On 27 April, he was posthumously promoted to captain.

== Awards and honours ==
Roussen was awarded several decorations for his successful service as a submarine commander: the War Cross Second Class, on 5 January 1940 (as XO of the Katsonis) and again on 25 February 1943, the War Cross First Class on 30 January 1942 and again posthumously on 23 April 1944, while on 1 September 1943 he was awarded the British Distinguished Service Cross. On 27 September 1945 he was posthumously awarded the Outstanding Actions Medal for his war service.

Two Hellenic Navy ships have been named after him: the landing ship Ypoploiarchos Roussen (L-164) (1958–2001), and the new fast attack craft Roussen (P67), the lead ship of the Roussen class, commissioned in December 2005.

== Sources ==
- Hellenic Navy - Submarine Papanikolis Y-2 (1927-1945)
- (in Greek) Hellenic Navy Historical Service - Biographies
- (in Greek) Hellenic Navy Historical Service - Ship histories
