= Battle of Chios (1912) =

Greek landing in the First Balkan War

Coordinates: 38°22′39″N 26°03′54″E

- Part of the First Balkan War
- Map of Chios and the nearby Çeşme Peninsula
Date	24 November 1912 – 3 January 1913; (1 month, 1 week, and 3 days)
Location	Chios, Ottoman Empire (present-day Greece)
Result	Greek victory
Territorial changes	Greeks capture Chios from the Ottomans

Belligerents
Greece	Ottoman Empire

Commanders and leaders
Ioannis Damianos; Nikolaos Delagrammatikas	Zihne Bey (POW)

Strength
5,000	2,000

Casualties and losses
36 killed 166 wounded	~200 killed >1,800 men captured

The Battle of Chios took place from 24 November 1912 to 3 January 1913 during the First Balkan War. It resulted in the capture of the eastern Aegean island of Chios by the Kingdom of Greece, ending almost 350 years of rule by the Ottoman Empire.

The occupation of the island was a prolonged affair. The Greek landing force, commanded by Colonel Nikolaos Delagrammatikas, was quickly able to seize the eastern coastal plain and the town of Chios, but the Ottoman garrison was well equipped and supplied, and managed to withdraw to the mountainous interior. A stalemate ensued, and operations almost ceased from the end of November and until the arrival of Greek reinforcements in late December.

Finally, the Ottoman garrison was defeated and forced to surrender on 3 January 1913.

== Background ==
The island of Chios had been ruled by the Ottoman Empire since 1566, when it was seized from the tributary Genoese Maona company as a recompense for the failure to capture Malta the previous year. Due to the production of gum mastic, the island remained prosperous and enjoyed considerable internal autonomy until 1866. The island had a mixed population of predominantly Greek Orthodox Christians, along with Roman Catholics ('Franks'), Jews, and Muslims, with the latter concentrated mostly in the town of Chios. In 1822, during the Greek War of Independence, the attempt by Greek revolutionaries from nearby Samos to raise the island in revolt ended in the Chios Massacre. Another attempt by Greek forces to capture the island in 1827–28 also failed.

With the outbreak of the First Balkan War in October 1912, the Greek fleet under Rear Admiral Pavlos Koundouriotis seized the strategic island of Lemnos at the entrance of the Dardanelles Straits, and proceeded to establish a naval blockade of the Straits. With the Ottoman fleet confined behind the Dardanelles, the Greeks were left with complete control of the Aegean Sea, and began occupying the Ottoman-ruled Aegean islands. Most of these islands had little to no garrisons, apart from the larger islands of Lesbos and Chios.

Due to the recent Italo-Turkish War, Chios had been particularly well prepared and supplied for a prolonged defence against a landing force, with a garrison composed of the 1st and 3rd Battalions of the 18th Infantry Regiment, the local Gendarmerie battalion, and a small artillery detachment totaling 2,000 men under Lieutenant Colonel Zihne Bey. As a result, the Greeks delayed moving against Chios and Lesbos until operations were concluded on the main front in Macedonia and forces could be spared for a serious assault. With rumours of a cease-fire circulating in late November, the speedy capture of these islands became imperative. Lesbos was attacked first, on 21 November [O.S. 8 November] 1912. For Chios, an ad hoc regiment-sized force was assembled at Thessaloniki under Colonel Nikolaos Delagrammatikas, comprising the 3rd Battalion of the 1st Infantry Regiment and two from Delagrammatikas' own 7th Infantry Regiment, to be joined by a battery of Krupp mountain guns from Piraeus.

== Fight for Chios ==
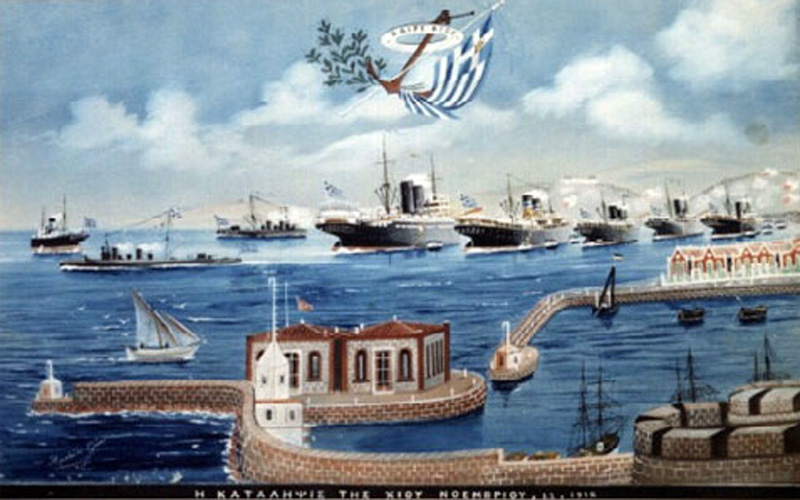
The Capture of Chios, by the Chian maritime painter Aristeidis Glykas

The landing force sailed from Thessaloniki in the liners Patris (7th Regiment elements and Col. Delagrammatikas) and Sapfo (1st Regiment elements) on 22 November [O.S. 9 November] 1912, while the artillery left Piraeus on the steamer Erietta. Patris sailed separately to Mytilene, in Lesbos, where it was joined by the cruiser squadron under Ioannis Damianos, before meeting the other two ships off Chios in the morning of 24 November [O.S. 11 November]. Damianos then ordered his ships to perform a demonstration of force off Chios town, before two Greek officers handed an ultimatum to the local Ottoman commander, requesting his surrender within three hours.

As the Ottomans rejected the ultimatum, at 15:12 the Greek forces (3rd Battalion/1st Regiment and fleet marines) started landing in the area of Kontari some 4 kilometres (2.5 mi) north of Chios town. The Ottomans had taken positions at the coast and provided fierce resistance to the landing attempt, but they were forced to retreat upon nightfall into the island's interior due to the strength of the Greek naval bombardment. The initial landing party encamped at Kontari while the remaining Greek forces completed their landing by the next morning, and entered Chios town unopposed at 08:00 on 25 November [O.S. 12 November]. The Ottoman force reassembled at the village of Karyes, just northwest of Chios town, and began firing at a Greek battalion that had been sent in that direction as a covering force. As a result, Delagrammatikas sent six companies and his artillery in an attack that seized the heights before Karyes. On the next day, the Greeks paused their attacks to reorganize their forces, but resumed their offensive on 27 November [O.S. 14 November], when 1st Battalion/7th Regiment managed to capture the villages of Agios Georgios and Dafnonas in the southwest. On the other hand, the initial Greek attacks on Karyes and the nearby Aipos heights failed with heavy casualties; the Aipos heights only fell after a night attack by the 3rd Battalion/1st Regiment on 29 November [O.S. 16 November].

Facing determined Ottoman resistance, the Greek commander ordered landings on other parts of Chios, so that the Ottoman forces could be encircled and forced to surrender. Thus on 1 December [O.S. 18 November] the auxiliary cruiser Makedonia landed a force that seized the Mounda Monastery on the island's western coast, while a 200-strong volunteer force was raised from the local population at Kardamyla on the northeast, and another force of Chian volunteers captured the village of Lithi in the southwest of the island. In addition, reinforcements arrived in the form of a reserve infantry battalion and an Evzone company, but as their training was incomplete, Delagrammatikas for the moment chose to maintain the blockade of the Ottomans, now reduced to the central, mountainous portions of Chios. Due to the adverse weather, the Greeks even abandoned some of their forward positions and retreated to the lowlands. The impasse continued, despite the arrival of 200 Cretan volunteers on 7 December [O.S. 24 November], and failed attacks by the Ottomans on the villages of Lithi, Karyes, and Agios Georgios five days later. Delagrammatikas resisted pressure to resume his offensive against the Ottomans as they held naturally defensible terrain, and on 13 December [O.S. 30 November] the Ministry for Naval Affairs ordered the cessation of offensive action.

In late December, the Greeks received additional reinforcements: 2nd Battalion of the 19th Infantry Regiment, another reservist battalion and a battery from Lesbos—whose conquest was not completed until 21 December—as well as a few more artillery pieces from the mainland. By that time the Greek force had reached a strength of 5,000 men. On 31 December [O.S. 18 December], Delagrammatikas ordered the final attack to overcome the Ottoman defenders for the next day. On the same evening, however, the Ottoman garrison sent envoys for negotiations, requesting to be allowed to evacuate the island with their arms and equipment to Çeşme. Delagrammatikas rejected the proposal, but in consequence of the negotiations the Greek attack was delayed until 2 January 1913 [O.S. 20 December 1912]. The assault began at 07:00, with the main thrust in the centre, from Vrontados to the Aipos heights, comprising a force of four battalions, the Evzone company, and 12 artillery pieces, led by Delagrammatikas himself. Despite fierce resistance, the attackers captured the heights by the afternoon, and pursued the retreating defenders towards Anavatos and Pityous. A secondary thrust from the south (1st Battalion/7th Regiment, along with volunteers and four guns) captured the Provatas heights. The combined effect of the Greek attack was that the Ottoman forces found themselves virtually encircled in the area of Anavatos, leaving them no option but unconditional surrender, which was completed on the next day. The last Ottoman forces at Pityous followed suit on the morning of 3 January 1913 [O.S. 21 December 1912].

The Ottoman forces taken prisoner amounted to 37 officers and about 1,800 other ranks. The capture of Chios cost the Greeks 36 killed and 166 wounded in action.

== Aftermath ==
The fate of the Aegean islands captured by Greece during the First Balkan War was the subject of prolonged diplomatic negotiations, as the Ottomans initially refused to cede them. Finally, in the Treaty of London, the fate of the islands was placed in the hands of the Great Powers, who in the event would cede them to Greece in February 1914, apart from the two closest to the Dardanelles, Imbros and Tenedos. Nevertheless, the Ottoman Empire was not reconciled to their loss, and a naval arms race followed, leading to a crisis in summer 1914 in which a new Greco-Turkish war appeared imminent; the crisis ended only through the outbreak of the First World War. The cession of Chios and the other islands to Greece was not finalized until the 1923 Treaty of Lausanne.

== Sources ==
- Erickson, Edward J. (2003). Defeat in Detail: The Ottoman Army in the Balkans, 1912–1913. Westport, CT: Greenwood. ISBN 0-275-97888-5.
- Gianoulopoulos, Giannis (1999). "Εξωτερική πολιτική" [Foreign policy]. Ιστορία της Ελλάδας του 20ού αιώνα, Τόμος Α′: Οι Απαρχές 1900-1922 [History of Greece in the 20th Century, Volume I: Beginnings 1900–1922]. Vol. 2. Athens: Vivliorama. pp. 107–147. ISBN 960-8087-02-3.
- Hall, Richard C. (2000). The Balkan Wars, 1912–1913: Prelude to the First World War. London: Routledge. ISBN 0-415-22946-4.
- Kargakos, Sarandos (2012). Η Ελλάς κατά τους Βαλκανικούς Πολέμους (1912-1913) [Greece in the Balkan Wars (1912-1913)] (in Greek). Athens: Peritechnon. ISBN 978-960-8411-26-5.
- Oikonomou, Nikolaos (1977). "Ο Α′ Βαλκανικός Πόλεμος: Οι επιχειρήσεις του ελληνικού στρατού και στόλου" [The First Balkan War: Operations of the Greek Army and Fleet]. In Christopoulos, Georgios A. & Bastias, Ioannis K. (eds.). Ιστορία του Ελληνικού Έθνους [History of the Greek Nation] (in Greek). Vol. ΙΔ: Νεώτερος Ελληνισμός από το 1881 έως το 1913 [Modern Hellenism from 1881 to 1913]. Athens: Ekdotiki Athinon. pp. 289–326. ISBN 978-960-213-110-7.
- Örenç, Ali Fuat (2009). "Sakız Adası". TDV Encyclopedia of Islam, Vol. 36 (Sakal – Sevm) (in Turkish). Istanbul: Presidency of Religious Affairs, Centre for Islamic Studies. pp. 6–10. ISBN 978-975-389-566-8.
- Soucek, S. (1995). "Ṣaḳi̊z". In Bosworth, C. E.; van Donzel, E.; Heinrichs, W. P. & Lecomte, G. (eds.). The Encyclopaedia of Islam, Second Edition. Volume VIII: Ned–Sam. Leiden: E. J. Brill. pp. 889–892. ISBN 978-90-04-09834-3.
- Επίτομη Ιστορία των Βαλκανικών Πολέμων 1912-1913 [Concise History of the Balkan Wars 1912–1913]. Athens: Hellenic Army General Staff, Army History Directorate. 1987. OCLC 51846788.
