= Greek submarine Xifias (1913) =

Naval vessel

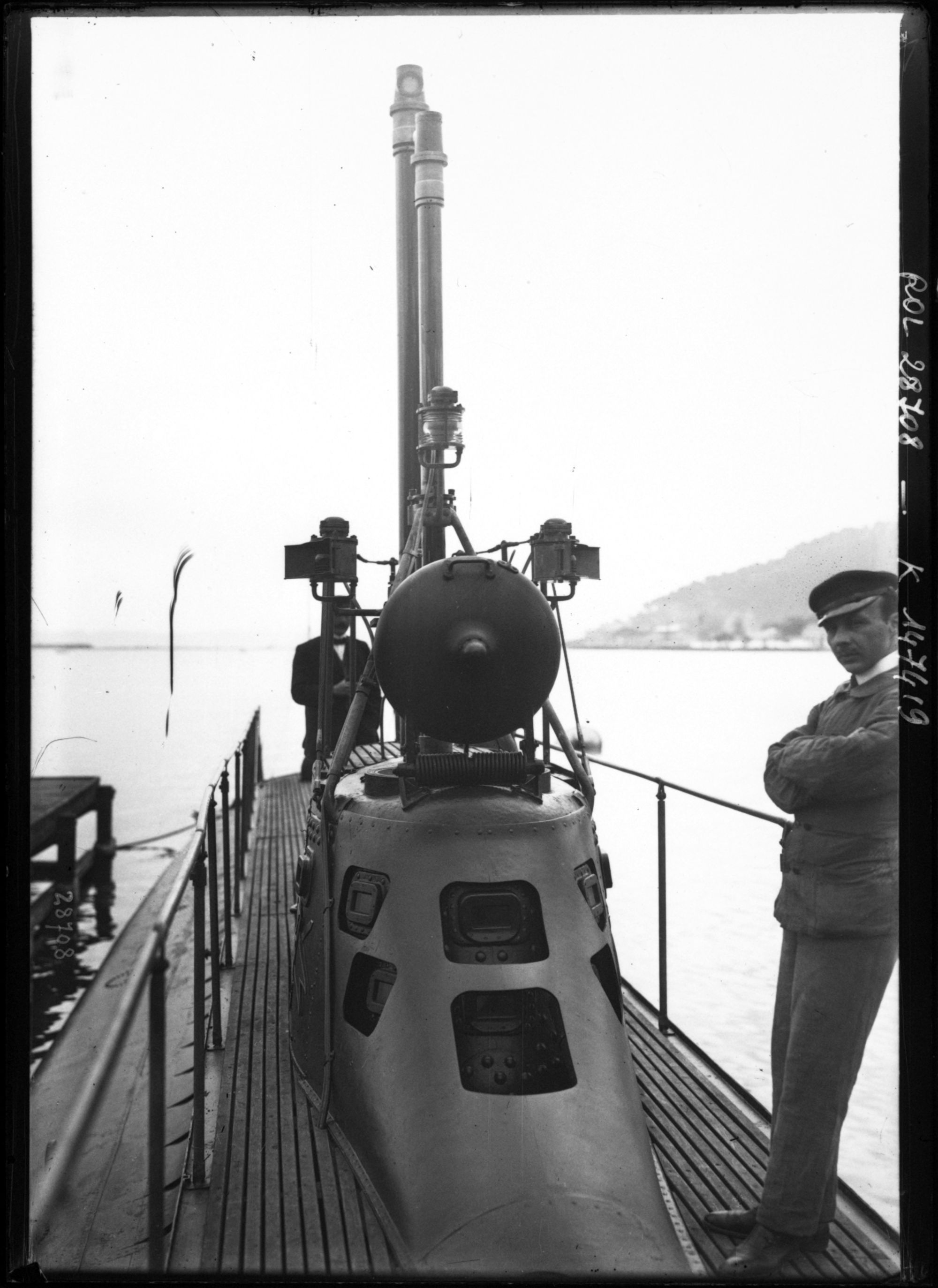
- The conning tower of Xifias at Toulon, 1913

History

Greece
- Ordered: September 1910
- Builder: Schneider Shipyards, Toulon
- Laid down: 1911
- Launched: 1913
- Commissioned: March 1913
- Decommissioned: 1920

General characteristics
- Class & type: Schneider-Laubeuf
- Displacement: surfaced: 360 tons; submerged: 452 tons
- Length: 49.5 m (162 ft)
- Speed: surfaced: 12 knots (22 km/h); submerged: 8 knots (15 km/h)
- Complement: 24
- Armament: 5 × 450mm T/T

Xifias (Greek: Ξιφίας, "swordfish") was a Greek submarine (actually called a "submersible", καταδυόμενον, according to the then current French terminology) which served during World War I. It was the third submarine to enter service in the Greek navy, and the second and last vessel of the Delfin class. It was taken over by the French in 1916, and decommissioned in 1920 without seeing action.

== Design and description ==
The submarine displaced 310 metric tons (310 long tons) surfaced and 460 metric tons (450 long tons) submerged. She measured 47.10 meters (154 ft 6 in) between perpendiculars, had a beam of 4.7 meters (15 ft 5 in) and a draft of 2.85 meters (9 ft 4 in). Delfin had an operational diving depth of 18 m (59 ft) and a maximum diving depth of 36 m (118 ft). Its complement consisted of 19 men.

Her hull was divided into seven compartments and she was fitted with seven external ballast tanks. The small depth of the flood port in the stern ballast tank meant that it took longer to fill; it was therefore always filled first. Diving was performed with the flood ports closed and the vent valves open, in order to prevent a negative inclination from the inflow of water in the bow and stern ballast tanks. Her rudder was manually controlled from the central compartment and the conning tower. It had two electrical periscopes, the stern periscope was operated from the central compartment while the bow periscope was controlled from the conning tower. Neither of which could modify their magnification or make observations above the line of the horizon. Xifias had three diving planes, the bow and stern ones were below the waterline, while the middle one was above the waterline. Schneider-Laubeuf type submarines had high levels of buoyancy (30-35%) and a complete light hull which protected the pressure hull.

For surface running, the boat was powered by two Schneider-Carels diesel engines which were heated by compressed air for 10-15 minutes by their corresponding two electric motors before starting. The electric motors used 94-cell batteries. The fuel used was gasoline bordering on paraffin. When submerged the propellers were driven by two Schneider electric motor using electricity from two 192-cell batteries. Xifias could reach 13 knots (24 km/h; 15 mph) on the surface and 8.5 knots (15.7 km/h; 9.8 mph) underwater. On the surface, the boat had a range of 1,800 nmi (3,300 km; 2,100 mi), submerged, she had a range of 48.8 nmi (90.4 km; 56.2 mi) at 4.5 knots (8.3 km/h; 5.2 mph).

She was armed with one internal 450 mm (17.7 in) torpedo tube in the bow and four Drzewiecki drop collars (two in the bow and two in the stern). She bore six Schwartzkopff type 450 mm (17.7 in) torpedoes, one in the torpedo tube, one in each frame and one stored in the bow compartment.

== Construction and service ==
=== Construction and delivery ===
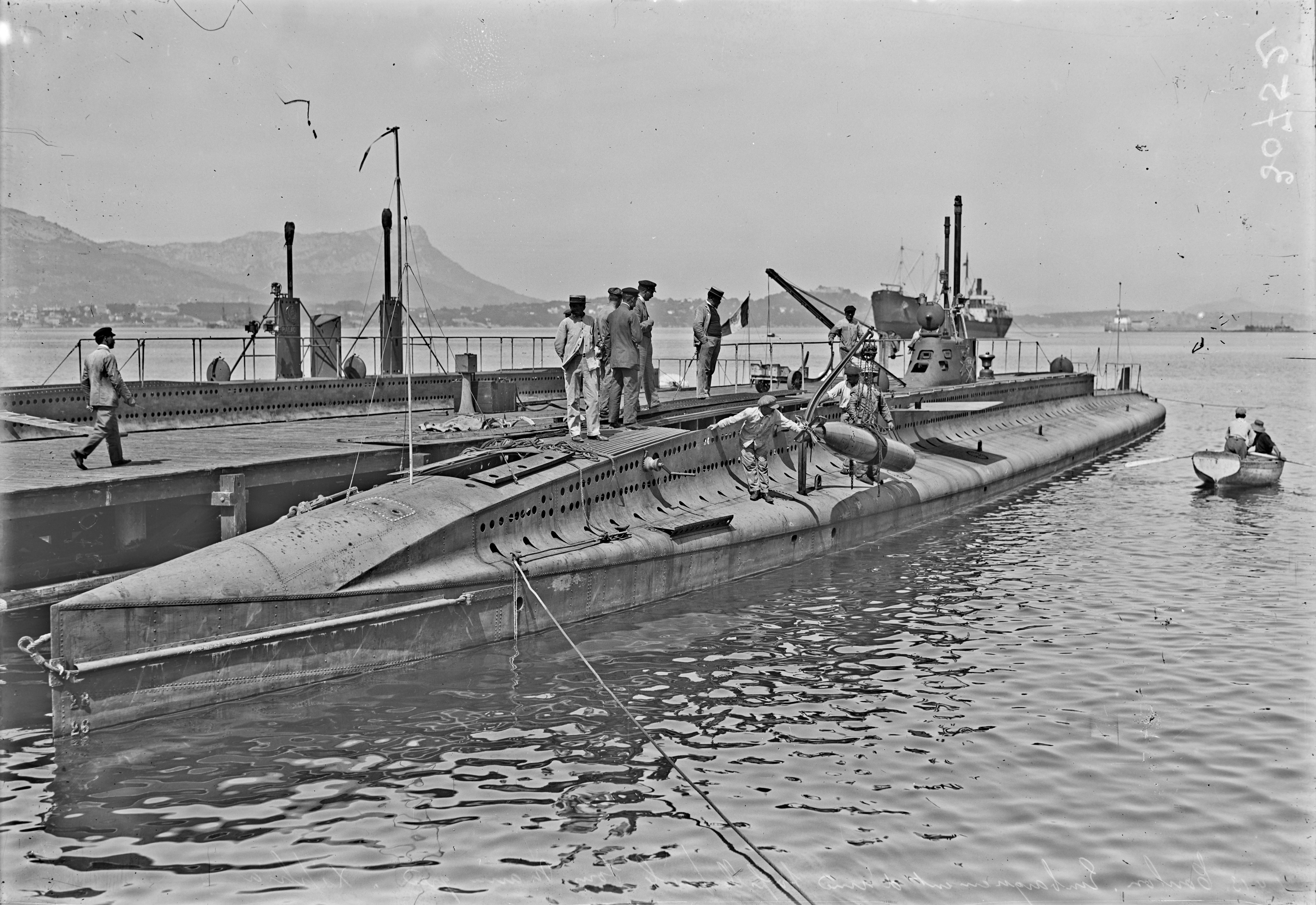
A torpedo being loaded into Xifias at Toulon

The Hellenic Navy underwent a major reorganization and rearmament in the aftermath of the 1909 Goudi coup. The putschists pressured the Greek government into ordering submersibles (as submarines were known at the time). Thus submersible Delfin and its sister ship Xifias were ordered from the Schneider Shipyards at Chalon-sur-Saône, France in September 1910. Xifias was named after Greek word for swordfish. The submarine was designed by naval architect Maxime Laubeuf.

She was delivered to the Hellenic Navy in March 1913, shortly after the end of the First Balkan War. It was thus unable to participate in any naval operations against the Ottoman fleet.

=== Service ===
The French news-photograph concern Agènce Rol produced a series of photographs of Xifias undergoing diving and submerged torpedo-firing tests off Toulon in June 1913. Like its sister ship, Xifias was plagued by mechanical problems and had insufficient operational capabilities; as a consequence, its use was minimal in the years that followed. Xifias and the rest of the Greek fleet were confiscated by the French in October 1916, during the Greek National Schism. When the ships were returned in 1918, the two submarines were in a bad shape, and the following year, they were decommissioned.

== Tradition ==
A second vessel of the Hellenic Navy has received the name Xifias: the British U-class submarine HMS Untiring, which was leased to Greece in 1945–1952.

== Bibliography ==
- Dimitrakopoulos, Anastasios (2015). Ιστορία του Πολεμικού Ναυτικού, 1874-1912 [History of the Greek Navy, 1874-1912] (in Greek). Vol. II. Hellenic Maritime Museum. ISBN 9786188218109.
- Fontenoy, Paul E. (2007). Submarines. Weapons and Warfare: An Illustrated History of Their Impact. ABC-CLIO. ISBN 9781851095681.
- Massouras, Timotheos G.; Katopodis, Thomas P. (2010). Hellenic Submarines. Vol. I. Hellenic Maritime Museum. ISBN 9789608853584.
- Paizis-Paradelis, Konstantinos (1979). Τά πλοία τοῦ Ἑλληνικοῦ Πολεμικοῦ Ναυτικοῦ 1830-1979 [Ships of the Greek Navy 1830-1979] (in Greek). Hellenic Navy General Staff.
