= Battle of Lesbos (1912) =

1912 battle of the First Balkan War

Coordinates: 39°12′36″N 26°16′48″E

- Part of the First Balkan War
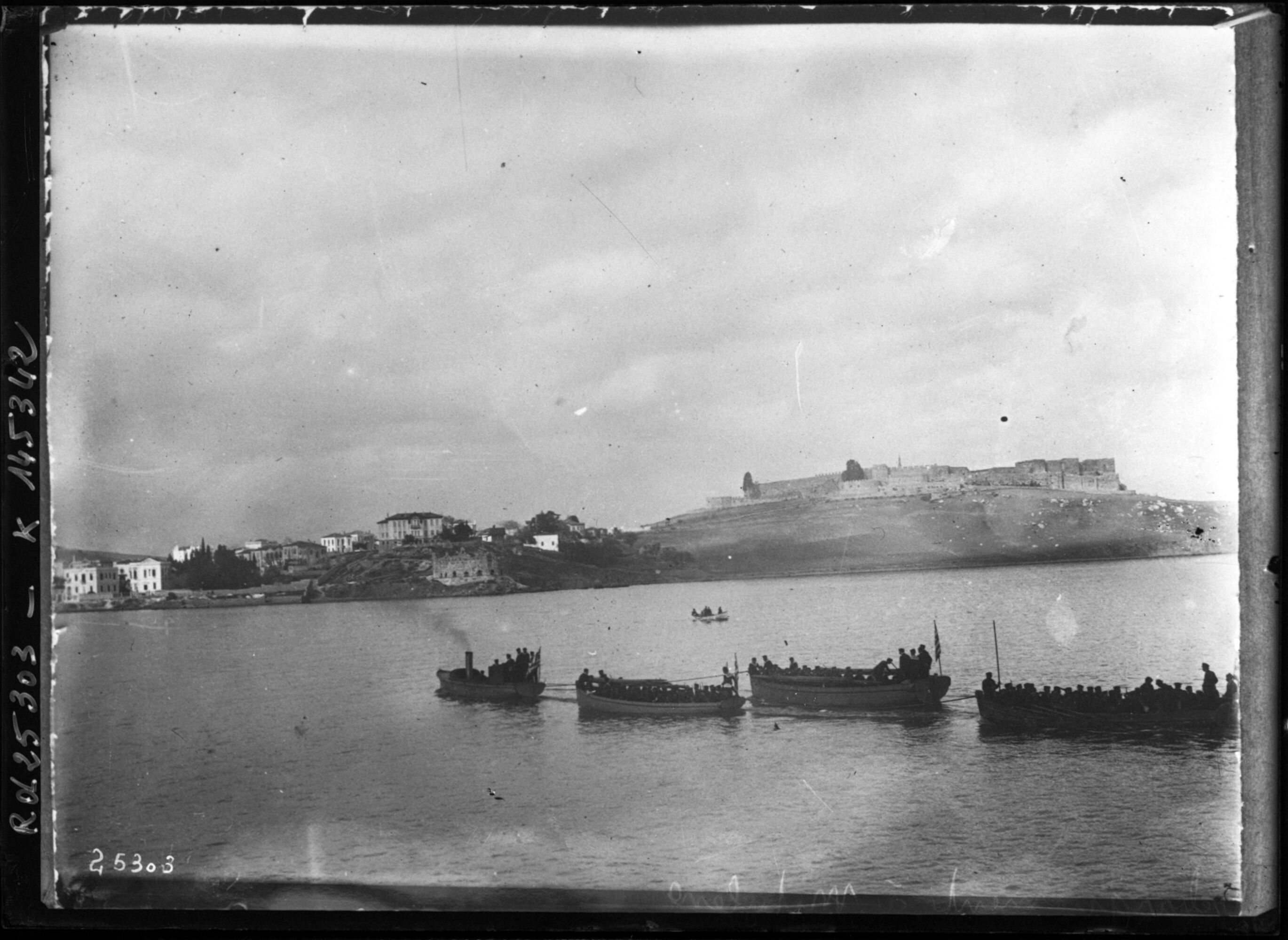
- Greek troops land at Mytilene, 21 November 1912
Date	21 November – 21 December 1912
Location	Lesbos
Result	Greek victory

Belligerents
(Kingdom of Greece) Greece	Ottoman Empire

Commanders and leaders
Pavlos Kountouriotis (Kingdom of Greece) Apollodoros Syrmakezis	(Ottoman Empire) Abdul Ghani (POW)

Strength
3,175	3,600

Casualties and losses
9 killed, 81 wounded	Ottoman garrison captured

The Battle of Lesbos took place from 21 November – 21 December 1912 during the First Balkan War, resulting in the capture of the eastern Aegean island of Lesbos by the Kingdom of Greece.

Greek naval forces, commanded by Rear Admiral Pavlos Kountouriotis, landed at the island's capital, Mytilene on 21 November 1912, while the Ottoman garrison evacuated the city. The operation to secure the rest of the island was then assigned to Colonel Apollodoros Syrmakezis. His forces were roughly equal in number to the Ottoman garrison, commanded by Major Abdul Ghani Pasha. Greek forces advanced methodically toward the Ottoman fortified camp at Filia, and reached its outskirts by 19 December. On 20 December, as the Greeks prepared to launch an assault, Ottoman commanders requested an armistice, leading to negotiations that culminated in the formal surrender of the Ottoman garrison on 21 December.

The capture of Lesbos, along with other Aegean islands, was a significant strategic gain for Greece. However, the final status of these islands became a subject of prolonged diplomatic negotiations, as the Ottoman Empire initially refused to cede them. The 1913 Treaty of London placed the fate of the islands in the hands of the Great Powers, who eventually ceded most of them, including Lesbos, to Greece in February 1914. This was finalized in the 1923 Treaty of Lausanne.

== Background ==
The island of Lesbos had been ruled by the Ottoman Empire since 1462, when it was conquered by Sultan Mehmed II from the Genoese Gattilusio family that had ruled it for over a century. Named Midilli after its capital, Mytilene, the island remained continuously under Ottoman rule until 1912, disrupted only by brief Venetian occupations in the First and Second Ottoman–Venetian wars. The large majority of the island's population remained Greek Christian, although there was a significant Muslim population accounting for up to a fifth of the total, who lived throughout the island. Relations between the two communities were generally good, and Lesbians were often bilingual in both Greek and Turkish. The port of Mytilene was one of the busiest in the Aegean Sea, and the island was relatively wealthy from trade, exporting many agricultural goods of its own, as well as benefiting from its geographical location on the major shipping routes. This prosperity also contributed to the island not participating in the Greek War of Independence in 1821–1829.

With the outbreak of the First Balkan War in October 1912, the Greek fleet under Rear Admiral Pavlos Koundouriotis seized the strategic island of Lemnos at the entrance of the Dardanelles Straits, and proceeded to establish a naval blockade of the Straits. With the Ottoman fleet confined behind the Daradanelles, the Greeks were left with complete control of the Aegean Sea, and began occupying the Ottoman-ruled Aegean islands. Most of these islands had few or no troops, apart from the larger islands of Chios and Lesbos; the latter was garrisoned by the 2nd Battalion of the 18th Infantry Regiment. The Ottoman garrison numbered 3,600 men, of whom 1,600 were professional soldiers, with the rest being irregulars and drafted Christians, commanded by Major Abdul Ghani Pasha whose headquarters were based in Molyvos.

As a result, the Greeks delayed moving against Chios and Lesbos until operations were concluded on the main front in Macedonia and forces could be spared for a serious assault. With rumours of a cease-fire circulating in late November, the speedy capture of these islands became imperative. Another factor was Bulgaria's rapid advance in Thrace and eastern Macedonia. Τhe Greek government feared that Bulgaria may use Lesbos as a bargaining chip during the course of future peace negotiations. An ad hoc force was assembled for capturing Lesbos: naval infantry detachments were gathered at Mudros Bay and boarded on the cruiser Averoff and the steamer Pelops, along with some light naval artillery and two machine guns. Setting sail for Lesbos on 7 November [O.S. 20 November] 1912, the landing force were joined on the way by a newly raised reservist infantry battalion (15 officers and 1,019 men) from Athens.

== Fight for Lesbos ==
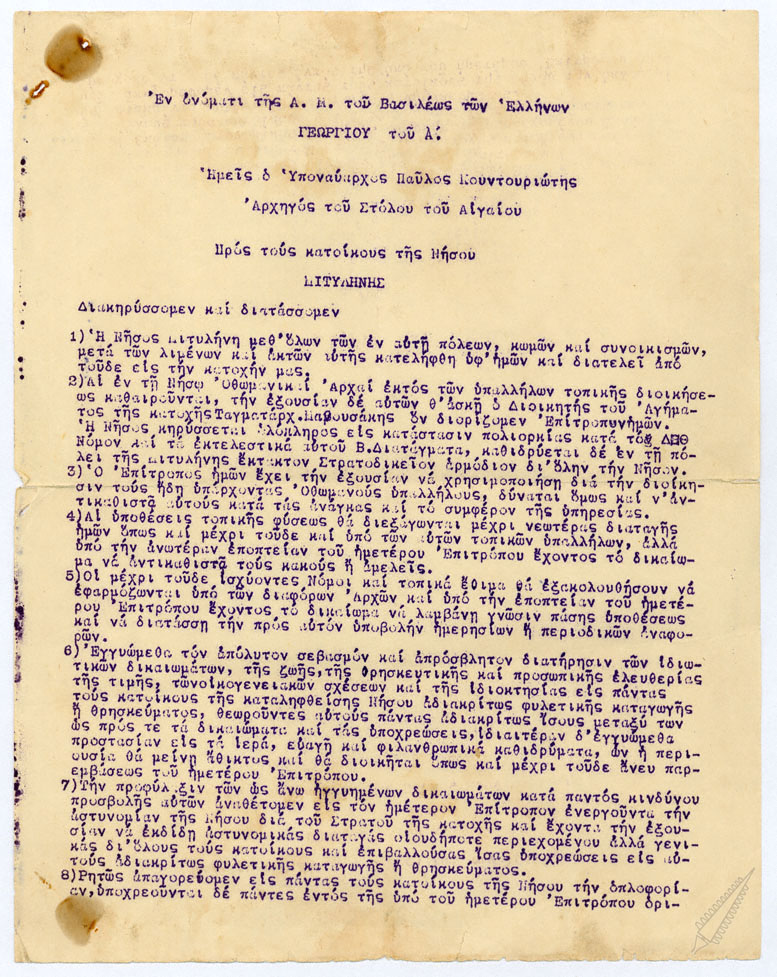
Proclamation issued by Rear Admiral Kountouriotis on the occupation of Mytilene

The landing force arrived at Mytilene on 07:00 on 21 November [O.S. 8 November] 1912, and Kountouriotis issued an ultimatum to the local Ottoman commander, requesting his surrender. After negotiations, the Ottoman garrison was given time to evacuate the city, which was promptly occupied by the Greek forces. After this was accomplished, Kountouriotis with the main part of the fleet left the island, leaving behind only the cruiser squadron and two destroyers. Prior to his departure, Kountouriotis formed a militia composed of local Greeks and appointed K. Melas as its commander. At the same time, the Ottoman troops, some 1,500–2,000 men, withdrew to a camp at Filia, some 50 kilometres (31 mi) northwest of Mytilene. The camp, erected during the recent Italo-Turkish War, was well supplied with provisions and munitions.

During the course of the Battle of Lesbos, the Ottomans perpetrated a series of massacres against the local Greek Christian population. The most notable was the massacre of the Christians in Petra, whose houses were set aflame by the retreating Ottoman forces on 22 November [O.S. 9 November]. For the moment, the Greeks at Mytilene, some 1,600 men, remained passive, advancing only a few smaller detachments to the interior as a covering force. A small naval infantry force was sent to capture Plomari on 23 November [O.S. 10 November] on board the auxiliary cruiser Makedonia, but rough seas prevented a landing, and it was instead re-routed to the ongoing operation to capture Chios further south. With the forces on the island manifestly insufficient to complete its capture, the Greek general headquarters sent reinforcements in the form of 2nd Battalion/19th Infantry Regiment, additional naval infantry, and six mountain guns, and placed the operation under the command of Colonel Apollodoros Syrmakezis.

After the reinforcements arrived on 14 December [O.S. 1 December], Syrmakezis had some 3,175 men and eight field guns at his disposal (although some 300 naval infantry served in police duties in the rear). This force was divided in two columns, a southern one at the village of Lambou Myloi and a northern one at Thermi. The two columns began their gradual advance towards the Ottoman camp at Filia on 16 December [O.S. 3 December]. By the night of the next day, they had reached the villages of Dafia and Agia Paraskevi respectively. As Syrmakezis wanted both columns to hit Filia simultaneously, he ordered the northern column halt for a day, while the advance of the southern column continued the next day, only to be stopped by strong Ottoman resistance near the Leimonas Monastery. The southern column still faced stiff resistance and made slow progress on 19 December [O.S. 6 December], but the northern column enjoyed rapid success, reaching the outskirts of Filia by nightfall.

On the next morning, both columns were ordered to launch their attack on Filia, but almost as soon as the Greek advance began, an Ottoman envoy appeared requesting an armistice for negotiations. This was granted, but when the Ottoman commander, Major Abdul Ghani, appeared at 11:00, he claimed that he had not requested negotiations and that he had no proposals to make. Dismissing this as a ploy to gain time, the Greek commander ordered the resumption of the offensive at 14:00. At 22:00, however, the same Ottoman envoy appeared, carrying a letter of surrender signed by the officers of the Ottoman garrison. Syrmakezis ordered an immediate cessation of hostilities, and the instrument of surrender of the Ottoman garrison was signed at 08:00 on the next day.

The capture of Lesbos cost the Greeks nine killed and 81 wounded in action.

== Aftermath ==
The fate of the Aegean islands captured by Greece during the First Balkan War was the subject of prolonged diplomatic negotiations, as the Ottomans initially refused to cede them. Finally, in the Treaty of London, the fate of the islands was placed in the hands of the Great Powers, who in the event would cede them to Greece in February 1914, apart from the two closest to the Dardanelles, Imbros and Tenedos. Nevertheless, the Ottoman Empire was not reconciled to their loss, and a naval arms race followed, leading to a crisis in summer 1914 in which a new Greco-Turkish war appeared imminent; the crisis ended only through the outbreak of the First World War. When the German cruiser SMS Breslau entered Ottoman service in August 1914, she was renamed Midilli in token of these claims.

The cession of Lesbos and the other islands to Greece was not finalized until the 1923 Treaty of Lausanne.

== Sources ==
- Erickson, Edward J. (2003). Defeat in Detail: The Ottoman Army in the Balkans, 1912–1913. Westport, CT: Greenwood. ISBN 0-275-97888-5.
- Gianoulopoulos, Giannis (1999). "Εξωτερική πολιτική" [Foreign policy]. Ιστορία της Ελλάδας του 20ού αιώνα, Τόμος Α′: Οι Απαρχές 1900-1922 [History of Greece in the 20th Century, Volume I: Beginnings 1900–1922]. Vol. 2. Athens: Vivliorama. pp. 107–147. ISBN 960-8087-02-3.
- Hall, Richard C. (2000). The Balkan Wars, 1912–1913: Prelude to the First World War. London: Routledge. ISBN 0-415-22946-4.
- Kargakos, Sarandos (2012). Η Ελλάς κατά τους Βαλκανικούς Πολέμους (1912-1913) [Greece in the Balkan Wars (1912–1913)] (in Greek). Athens: Peritechnon. ISBN 978-960-8411-26-5.
- Kiel, Machiel (2005). "Midilli". TDV Encyclopedia of Islam, Vol. 30 (Misra – Muhammedi̇yye) (in Turkish). Istanbul: Presidency of Religious Affairs, Centre for Islamic Studies. pp. 11–14. ISBN 978-975-389-402-9.
- Soucek, S. (1991). "Midilli". In Bosworth, C. E.; van Donzel, E. & Pellat, Ch. (eds.). The Encyclopaedia of Islam, Second Edition. Volume VI: Mahk–Mid. Leiden: E. J. Brill. pp. 1035–1037. doi:10.1163/1573-3912_islam_SIM_5180. ISBN 978-90-04-08112-3.
- Επίτομη Ιστορία των Βαλκανικών Πολέμων 1912-1913 [Concise History of the Balkan Wars 1912–1913]. Athens: Hellenic Army General Staff, Army History Directorate. 1987. OCLC 51846788.
