= Miltiadis Iatridis =

Greek naval officer (1906–1960)

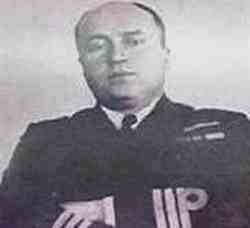
- Miltiadis Iatridis, commander of Greek submarine “Papanikolis”, photo by unknown author c. 1940
- Born: 1906; Sofiko, Corinthia, Greece
- Died: 18 February 1960 (aged 53–54); Agioi Theodoroi
- Military career
- Allegiance: Greece
- Branch: Royal Hellenic Navy
- Service years: 1921–1952
- Rank: Captain
- Commands: Papanikolis (Y-2)
- Conflicts: Greco-Italian War
- Awards: Gold Cross of Valour

Miltiadis Iatridis (Greek: Μιλτιάδης Ιατρίδης; 1906–1960) was a Greek naval officer active during World War II.

== Early life and education ==
He was born in the village Sofiko in the Peloponnese in 1906. He entered the Hellenic Naval Academy in 1921 and graduated in 1926. He was promoted to lieutenant in 1939.

== Career ==
By the outbreak of the Greco-Italian War in 1940 he was captain of the submarine Papanikolis with the rank of lieutenant commander. Carrying out six wartime patrols in the Adriatic Sea, the Papanikolis sunk two Italian cargo vessels, earning Iatridis a promotion to Commander and the Gold Cross of Valour, Greece's highest award for gallantry. Following the German invasion, Iatridis led the Papanikolis to Allied-controlled Egypt. For the remainder of the war, he was assigned mostly shore duties, largely because of his often strained relationship with superiors.

Following the liberation of Greece in October 1944, he was appointed commander-in-chief of the Aegean fleet (1944–1945), subsequently commander of the North Aegean squadron (1947) and of the Naval Academy (1948). In 1950–1951, he headed the mission that was sent to Italy to receive the former Italian cruiser Eugenio di Savoia, that was to be handed over to Greece as war reparations and was commissioned into the Greek Navy as Elli II. He resigned from the service on 29 December 1952 with the rank of captain.

== Death ==
Iatridis was killed at Agioi Theodoroi in a car accident in 1960. The city of Pyrgos, the birthplace of his father, named a square after Cpt. Iatridis, where his bust was later erected.
