= Protefs-class submarine =

Greek navy submarine class

Class overview
- Name: Protefs class
- Builders: Chantiers de la Loire shipyard
- Operators: Hellenic Navy
- Preceded by: Katsonis
- Built: 1928–1929
- In commission: 1929–1945
- Completed: 4
- Lost: 3
- Retired: 1

General characteristics
- Type: Submarine
- Displacement: surfaced: 750 tons; submerged: 960 tons
- Length: 68.6 m (225 ft)
- Beam: 5.73 m (18.8 ft)
- Draft: 4.18 m (13.7 ft)
- Propulsion: two-shaft Sulzer diesel engines; two electric engine motors; 1420bhp, 1,200 shp
- Speed: surfaced: 14 kn (26 km/h; 16 mph); submerged: 9.5 kn (17.6 km/h; 10.9 mph)
- Range: 3,500 nmi (6,500 km; 4,000 mi) surfaced @ 10 kn (19 km/h; 12 mph)
- Endurance: 100 nmi (190 km; 120 mi) submerged @ 5 kn (9.3 km/h; 5.8 mph)
- Test depth: 260 ft (80 m)
- Complement: 41
- Armament: 6 × 21-inch (533 mm) internal bow T/T, 2 × 21-inch (533 mm) Internal stern T/T; 1 × 100 mm gun, 1 x 3pdr AA gun

The Protefs class (referred to as the Proteus class in some sources) was a group of submarines built for the Hellenic Navy in the late 1920s. The boats were built to a Loire-Simonot design in France and were larger than the preceding Katsonis class built by a different French company.

== Ships in class ==
Four boats were built, all were named after sea gods from Greek mythology.

Ship	Builder	Launched	Fate
Protefs (Y3) Πρωτεύς	AC de la Loire	24 October 1927	sunk 19 December 1940, rammed by Italian torpedo boat Antares off Valona, Albania
Nirefs (Y4) Νηρεύς	AC de la Loire	December 1927	Decommissioned 1945
Triton (Y5) Τρίτων)	AC de la Loire	4 April 1928	sunk 16 November 1942 by German patrol boat UJ2102 near Euboea
Glafkos (Y6) Γλαύκος	Chantiers Navales Français Blainville	1928	Lost 4 April 1942

The three boats which survived the fall of Greece in 1941 served under overall Royal Navy control in the Eastern Mediterranean.

== Bibliography ==
- Caruana, Joseph (2012). "Emergency Victualling of Malta During WWII". Warship International. LXIX (4): 357–364. ISSN 0043-0374.
- Mühlthaler, Erich (1998). "Question 51/97". Warship International. XXXV (4): 419–420. ISSN 0043-0374.
