= Greek submarine Papanikolis (Y-2) =

World War II submarine

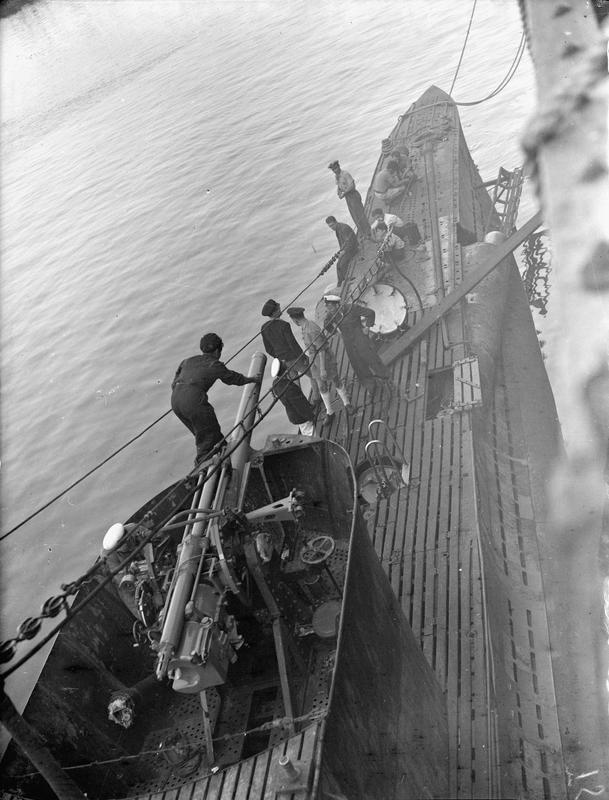
- Y-2 Papanikolis – Y-2 Παπανικολής

History

Greece
- Name: Papanikolis (Greek: Y-2 Παπανικολής)
- Namesake: Dimitrios Papanikolis
- Builder: Chantiers de la Loire, Nantes
- Laid down: 1925
- Launched: 19 November 1926
- Commissioned: 21 December 1927
- Decommissioned: 1945
- Fate: Hull sold for scrap, conning tower preserved in the Maritime Museum, Piraeus
- Notes: Historical summary from the Hellenic Navy website

General characteristics
- Class & type: Katsonis-class submarine
- Displacement: 576 long tons (585 t) surfaced; 775 long tons (787 t) submerged
- Length: 62.5 m (205 ft 1 in)
- Beam: 5.3 m (17 ft 5 in)
- Draft: 3.6 m (11 ft 10 in)
- Propulsion: 1 × 1,300 hp (970 kW) diesel engine; 1 × 1,000 hp (750 kW) electric motor
- Speed: 14 knots (26 km/h; 16 mph) surfaced; 9 knots (17 km/h; 10 mph) submerged
- Complement: 30
- Armament: 2 × 21 in (533 mm) internal bow torpedo tubes; 2 × 21 in (533 mm) external bow torpedo tubes; 2 × 21 in (533 mm) external stern torpedo tubes; 1 × 100 mm (4 in) gun; 2 × machine guns

Papanikolis (Greek: Y-2 Παπανικολής) was one of the most successful Greek submarines during the Second World War.

== History ==
Papanikolis, together with her sister ship, Katsonis, formed the first class of Greek submarines ordered after the First World War. She was built at the Chantiers de la Loire shipyards between 1925 and 1927, and commissioned into the Hellenic Navy on 21 December 1927. Its first captain was Cdr P. Vandoros.

Despite her age and mechanical problems, she participated in the 1940–41 Greco-Italian War under the command of Lieutenant Commander Miltiadis Iatridis, carrying out six war patrols in the Adriatic. During one of these, on 22 December 1940, she sank the small Italian motor ship Antonietta, and, on the very next day, the 3,952-ton troop carrier Firenze near Sazan Island. After the German invasion of April 1941, together with the rest of the fleet, Papanikolis fled to the Middle East, from where she would operate during the next years, carrying out nine war patrols in total.

Under the command of Commander Athanasios Spanidis, the former captain of Katsonis, she participated in two patrols in the Aegean Sea in 1942. During the first, in June 1942, she sank six small sailing vessels between 11 and 14 June, and proceeded to disembark SOE agents in Crete and receive a team of 15 New Zealand commandos. During the next patrol, from 31 August to 15 September, she unsuccessfully attacked an 8,000-ton oil carrier, and disembarked two mixed British-Greek commando teams at Rhodes, which succeeded in attacking the island's two airfields and destroying a large number of Axis aircraft in "Operation Anglo".

Coming under the command of Lieutenant Nikolaos Roussen, the submarine went into another patrol in November, offloading men, including from SOE Xan Fielding, Arthur Reade, Niko Souris and Alec Tarves, and from ISLD Stello Papaderos together with equipment on southern Crete. On 30 November, Papanikolis successfully ambushed and sank an 8,000-ton cargo vessel at the Alimnia islet, near Rhodes. On 17 January 1943, after carrying agents and equipment to Hydra, she captured the 200-ton sailing vessel Agios Stefanos and manned her with part of her crew, which sailed her to Alexandria, while the next day, she sank another 150-ton sailer. During subsequent patrols in March and May, she sank further four sailers, totaling 450 tons.

Papanikolis survived the war and returned to Greece after liberation in October 1944. However, she was severely outdated, and was decommissioned in 1945. The ship's conning tower was preserved and is on display in the Hellenic Maritime Museum at Piraeus.

== Captains ==
- Lieutenant Commander Miltiadis Iatridis (1940–1941)
- Lieutenant Nikolaos Roussen (1941)
- Lieutenant A. Panagiotou (1 January 1942 – 13 March 1942)
- Lieutenant Commander P. Libas (14 March 1942 – 20 April 1942)
- Commander Athanasios Spanidis (20 April 1942 – 10 October 1942)
- Lieutenant Nikolaos Roussen (10 October 1942 – 1943)
- Lieutenant Ch. Botsaris (1944)

== Tradition ==
Two other vessels of the Hellenic Navy have received the name Papanikolis: the Balao-class GUPPY IIA submarine Papanikolis (S-114) (in service 1972–1992) and the lead ship of the new Type 214 submarine class, Papanikolis (S-120).
