= Greek submarine Katsonis (Y-1) =

20th-century ship

History

Greece
- Name: Katsonis (Greek: Y-1 Κατσώνης)
- Namesake: Lambros Katsonis
- Builder: Forges et Chantiers de la Gironde
- Laid down: 1925
- Launched: 20 March 1926
- Commissioned: 8 June 1928
- Fate: Sunk 14 September 1943
- Notes: Historical summary from the Hellenic Navy website

General characteristics
- Class & type: Katsonis-class submarine
- Displacement: surfaced: 576 tons; submerged: 775 tons
- Length: 62.5 m (205 ft)
- Beam: 5.3
- Draft: 3.6 m (12 ft)
- Propulsion: one 1,300 hp (970 kW) diesel engine, one 1,000 hp (750 kW) electric engine
- Speed: surfaced: 14 knots (26 km/h; 16 mph); submerged: 9 knots (17 km/h; 10 mph)
- Complement: 30
- Armament: 2 × 21-inch (533 mm) internal bow T/T, 2 × 21-inch (533 mm) external bow T/T, 2 × 21-inch (533 mm) external stern T/T, 1 × 100 mm gun, 2 MGs

Y-1 Katsonis (Greek: Y-1 Κατσώνης) was a Greek submarine active during the Second World War. Katsonis, together with her sister ship, Papanikolis, formed the first class of Greek submarines ordered after the First World War. The submarine was built at the Forges et Chantiers de la Gironde shipyard, in Lormont, between 1925 and 1927, and commissioned into the Hellenic Navy on 8 June 1928. Her very first captain was Cdr Konstantinos Arvanitis.

== Service history ==
Under the command of Cdr Athanasios Spanidis, Katsonis participated in the 1940-41 Greco-Italian War, carrying out four war patrols, and sinking one vessel, the 531-ton Italian freighter Quinto, on 31 December 1940. After the German invasion of April 1941, together with the rest of the fleet, Katsonis fled to the Middle East, from where she would operate during the next years, with the British pennant number N 16. On 2 July 1942, she was damaged while exiting a dry dock at Port Said.

After overhaul, under the command of Cdr. Vasileios Laskos, she went on further three patrols in the Aegean. During these patrols, Katsonis ambushed and sank an Italian minelayer in the port of Gytheio on 2 April 1943, the Spanish 535-ton merchant vessel San Isidoro off Kythnos three days later, and the freighter Rigel near Skiathos on 29 May. On 14 September however, while trying to intercept a German troop transport, she was attacked and sunk by the German submarine chaser UJ-2101 (ex Greek mine sweeper Strymon, Cdr Kptlt. Friedrich Vollheim).

After being spotted on the surface, the Katsonis dived, but after depthcharging she was forced to surface and continued fighting with her deck gun. Finally UJ-2101 rammed the submarine.

32 men of the crew, including Cdr Laskos, went down with her, and 15 were captured. Among them was Konstantinos Stamoulis, a survivor who was considered dead for decades. However, Lt Elias Tsoukalas, the ship's XO, and petty officers Antonios Antoniou and Anastasios Tsigros, managed to swim for 9 hours and reach Skiathos. There they hid and managed to return to Egypt and rejoin the Greek fleet.

=== Patrol history ===
In all, Katsonis' career in World War II encompassed seven patrols and four ships sunk:

| Patrol No. | Dates | Ships sunk | Patrol area | Duration in hours (surfaced/submerged) |
|---|---|---|---|---|
| 1 | 3–10 Nov 1940 | | Adriatic Sea | 216 (132/84) |
| 2 | 22 Dec 1940 – 4 Jan 1941 | petrol carrier Quinto | Adriatic Sea | 312 (180/132) |
| 3 | 14–21 Feb 1941 | | Adriatic Sea | 168 (108/60) |
| 4 | 24 Mar 1941 – 1 Apr 1941 | | Adriatic Sea | 216 (132/84) |
| 5 | 28 Mar 1943 – 10 Apr 1943 | 1 German minelayer, freighter San Isidoro, 2 schooners | Aegean Sea/Crete | 408 (170/238) |
| 6 | 21 May 1943 – 4 Jun 1943 | freighter Rigel | Aegean Sea | 456 (86/270) |
| 7 | 5–14 Sep 1943 | | Aegean Sea | 212 (107/105) |

== Rediscovery ==
In July 2016 the wreck was located by Greek's Navy Oceanographic vessel HS Naftilos A-478 (Υ/Γ-Ω/Κ Ναυτίλος). She lies off the coast of Skiathos at a depth of 170 m.

== Tradition ==
The submarine was named after the 18th-century Greek naval hero, admiral Lambros Katsonis. The name "Katsonis" has been given to three other Greek ships: a Town-class light cruiser that was taken over by the Royal Navy during World War I as HMS Chester, the Tench-class submarine Katsonis (II), and the modern Type 214 submarine Katsonis (S-123) (III).

A memorial to the submarine and its crew stands on shore at the old port in Skiathos town. Remembrance services are held annually.
