= 7th Infantry Regiment (Greece) =

- 7ο Σύνταγμα Πεζικού
- Active: 1897–1941; 1974; 1975–1996
- Country: Greece
- Type: infantry
- Battle honours: Greco-Turkish War of 1897; Balkan Wars; First Balkan War; Second Balkan War; World War I; Macedonian front; Allied intervention in the Russian Civil War; Greco-Turkish War of 1919–1922; Battle of the Sakarya; World War II; Greco-Italian War

The 7th Infantry Regiment (Greek: 7ο Σύνταγμα Πεζικού, abbrev. 7 ΣΠ) is a historic infantry regiment of the Hellenic Army, and the predecessor of the 7th Mechanized Infantry Brigade.

== History ==
The 7th Infantry Regiment was established on 19 March 1897, during the mobilization in the lead-up to the Greco-Turkish War of 1897, as part of the 2nd Infantry Division. The regiment also fought in the Balkan Wars of 1912–13, the Macedonian front of World War I, the Allied intervention in the Russian Civil War in 1919, the Asia Minor Campaign (1920–22), and the Greco-Italian War (1940–41), being disbanded on 10 February 1941.

The regiment was re-established on 20 July 1974 at Chrysoupoli, during the mobilization that followed the Turkish invasion of Cyprus, as part of the 12th Infantry Division. It comprised the 641st, 642nd, 643rd, and 648th Infantry Battalions. The regiment was ordered disbanded again on 19 September, which was completed by 26 September. The regiment was reactivated on 6 February 1975 at Eleftheroupoli, with the 640th and 641st Battalions. Originally under the 11th Infantry Division, in 2–5 June it was moved to the area of Mavrokklisi in the Evros Prefecture under the 12th Infantry Division.

In March 1996, it was transformed into the 7th Mechanized Infantry Brigade.

== Sources ==
- Ιστορία 7ης Μ/Κ ΤΑΞΙΑΡΧΙΑΣ [History of the 7th Mech. Brigade] (in Greek), Hellenic Army General Staff, Army History Directorate, 17 October 1998
