= Capture of Lemnos =

1912 Greek victory of the First Balkan War

Coordinates: 39°53′14″N 25°11′35″E

- Part of the First Balkan War
- Map of the northeastern Aegean Sea, showing the location of Lemnos in front of the Dardanelles
Date	18–21 October 1912
Location	Lemnos
Result	Greek occupation of Lemnos; Greek naval blockade of the Dardanelles Strait

Belligerents
(Kingdom of Greece) Greece	Ottoman Empire

Commanders and leaders
Pavlos Kountouriotis	Unknown

The Capture of Lemnos took place in October 1912 during the First Balkan War, serving as the opening action between Greek and Ottoman forces in the Aegean Sea. The strategic value of the island of Lemnos had been recognized by Greek naval planners for many years, as it lay at the entrance of the Dardanelles Strait and offered an excellent natural harbour in Mudros Bay. The island was occupied with little resistance from the small Ottoman garrison, which was taken prisoner. Mudros Bay was made into a forward naval base for the Greek navy, enabling it to blockade the Dardanelles and secure naval dominance in the Aegean. This obstructed the movement of Ottoman reinforcements to the front lines, and allowed the capture of the remaining Ottoman-held Aegean islands over the following months. Ceded to Greece in 1914, due to the subsequent outbreak of World War I, the island's status remained disputed, and its annexation to Greece was not confirmed until the Treaty of Lausanne in 1923.

== Background ==
The island of Lemnos had been ruled by the Ottoman Empire since 1456, when Sultan Mehmed II captured the domains of the Genoese Gattilusio dynasty in the northeastern Aegean Sea. The population of the island remained predominantly Greek throughout Ottoman rule. French scholar Vital Cuinet, in his 1896 work La Turquie d'Asie, recorded a population of 27,079, of which 2,450 were Muslims and the rest Greek Orthodox.

Already during the Greco-Turkish War of 1897, the Greek government had considered the occupation of the northern Aegean Islands, chiefly Lemnos and Imbros, due to their strategic location at the entrance of the Dardanelles Strait. However, despite the superiority of the recently modernized Royal Hellenic Navy over the Ottoman Navy at that time, the Greek naval command hesitated to carry out these tasks, and the rapid defeat of the Greek army on land in Thessaly led to the quick conclusion of the war in a humiliating Greek defeat. In subsequent years, Greek naval strategists such as Konstantinos Dosios (Η κατά θάλασσαν Ελλάς, 'Greece and Sea-Power', 1900) and Periklis Argyropoulos (Το Ναυτικόν της Ελλάδος πρόγραμμα, 'The Naval Programme of Greece', 1905) pointed out that the task of seizing Lemnos would be of crucial importance in a Greco-Turkish naval war. The importance of Lemnos was also appreciated by Italy, which envisaged occupying it during its own 1911–1912 war with the Ottomans, only to back down due to the vehement opposition of Austria-Hungary.

Nevertheless, when the First Balkan War broke out in October 1912, existing Greek plans called for the port of Oreos in northern Euboea to be the wartime anchorage for the Greek fleet, as in 1897. This was a choice that was fraught with distinct disadvantages for the Greeks: unlike in 1897, the Ottomans' main warships were more modern, faster and powerful than the Greeks'. In addition, according to the 1912 Greco-Bulgarian military convention that signalled Greece's entry into the Balkan League against the Ottoman Empire, the Greek fleet undertook the role of establishing dominance in the Aegean Sea and interrupting seaborne Ottoman communications between Asia Minor and the Balkans. This meant keeping a close watch on the Dardanelles to prevent a sortie of the Ottoman fleet. In that case, a forward anchorage was an absolute necessity, both to allow the Greek patrol ships to recover in the harsh winter conditions of the Aegean, as well as to allow them to be supported in a timely manner by the slower Greek battleship squadron. Mudros Bay in Lemnos satisfied this need.

== Capture of Lemnos ==
At the outbreak of the war, the commander-in-chief of the Greek navy, Rear Admiral Pavlos Kountouriotis, divided the fleet into two: the bulk of the available ships became the Aegean Sea Fleet, under his own command, and the remainder formed a small Ionian Sea Squadron. It was also apparently Koundouriotis, on his own initiative, who selected Lemnos as the forward base for the Greek fleet, instead of Oreos. The Greek Prime Minister, Eleftherios Venizelos, was persuaded by the admiral's suggestion, but insisted on obtaining the consent of the British government for this first.

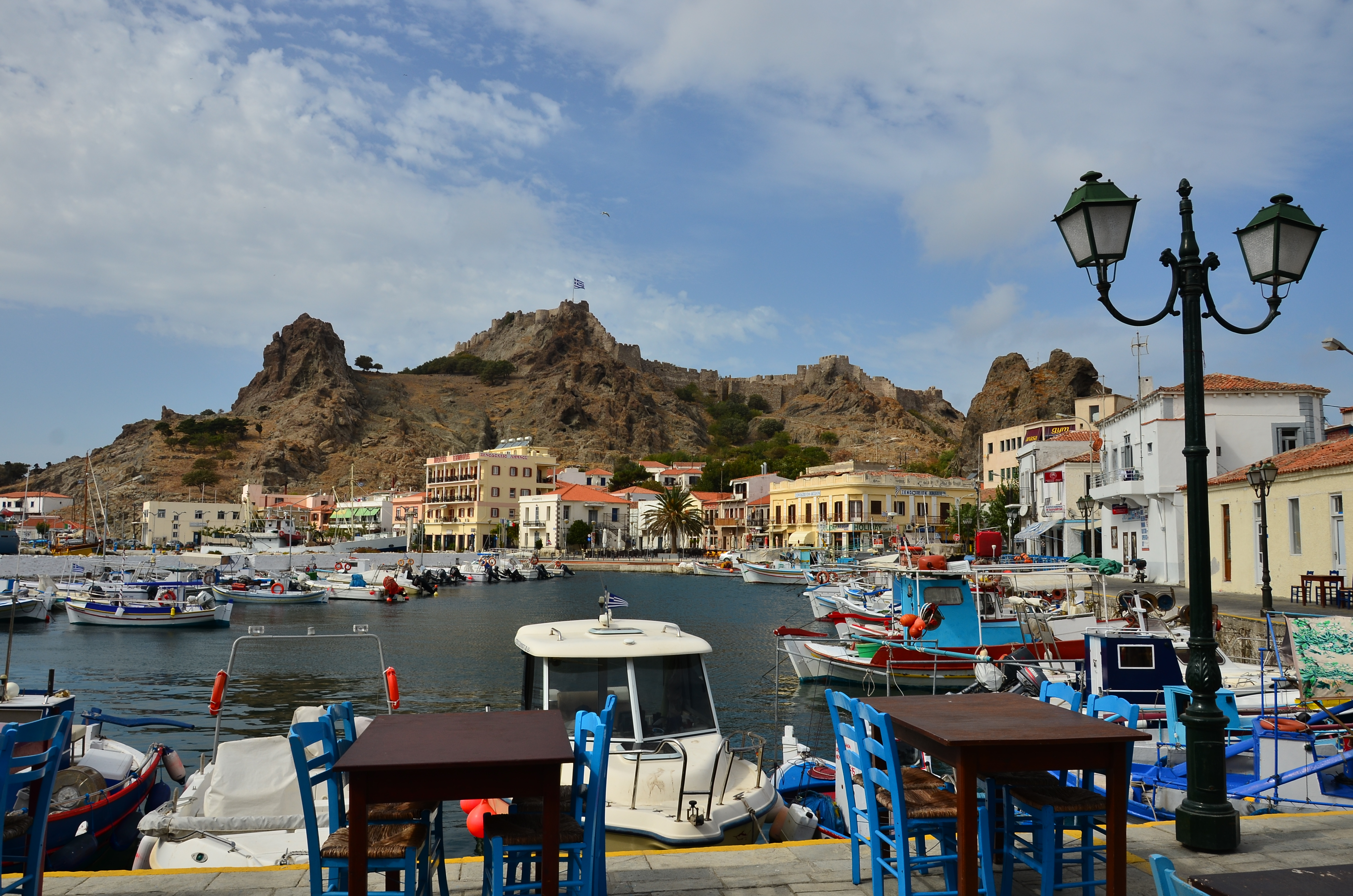
View of the harbour and citadel of Myrina in 2013

The Aegean Fleet under Koundouriotis set sail on 18 October [O.S. 5 October] 1912, followed by the passenger steamer Pineios, carrying two companies of the 20th Infantry Regiment to be used as a landing force. The fleet arrived at the capital of Lemnos, Kastro (Myrina) at 14:00 on the next day, and Koundouriotis issued a demand for the surrender of the island's garrison. The Ottoman forces on the island were small, some thirty men and three officers according to Turkish sources, while Greek sources give 47 men and three officers. The local Ottoman governor, stalling for time, replied that he was unaware of the declaration of war, and requested a 24-hour period to consider his answer.

With the arrival of Pineios on 20 October [O.S. 7 October], Kountouriotis moved his ships into Mudros Bay. The Ottomans having failed to respond to the Greek admiral's demands, the Greek forces began landing at 08:00 on 21 October [O.S. 8 October] on the western coast of Mudros Bay. The landing, under Major Ioulianos Kontaratos, was unopposed, and was completed in three hours. After that, the Greek troops moved west towards Kastro. The Greeks encountered only minor resistance, by the Ottoman garrison and a group of about 280 armed Muslim inhabitants of the village of Lera (modern Agios Dimitrios). Their resistance was overcome after a brief firefight, as the Ottomans dispersed. The Greeks suffered no casualties. The Greek force arrived at Kastro during the night, taking over control of the city. The Greek flag was raised over the island's capital the next day, 22 October [O.S. 9 October]. The Ottoman garrison were taken as prisoners of war to Athens.

== Aftermath ==
According to the historian Richard Hall, "The conquest of Lemnos effectively closed the Dardanelles". Mudros became the base for Greek naval operations for the rest of the war. While an excellent natural harbour, Mudros had no infrastructure of any kind at the time. Thus the Greek fleet's main anchorage had to be provisioned and supplied with coal by ship from Piraeus. Likewise, water was also brought by ship from Thessaloniki. A wireless station was established at the islet of Koumbi, while destroyers permanently patrolled the bay entrance for protection against torpedo boat attacks. Eventually, four 100 millimetres (3.9 in) guns, taken from the auxiliary cruisers Esperia and Arkadia, were installed for coastal defence purposes.

Based at Lemnos, the Greeks were able to maintain a close blockade of the Dardanelles, and in two naval battles, at Elli on 16 December 1912 and Lemnos on 18 January 1913, forced the sortieing Ottoman fleet back into the Straits. This cemented Greek control of the Aegean, allowing the Greeks to transport troops and supplies freely, while denying the same to their opponents. Given the incomplete state of the Ottoman rail network, the Greek blockade of the Empire's coasts had a major impact: the Ottoman army's Asian reinforcements were stuck in remote provinces or had to march on foot towards Constantinople, before they could cross into Europe and affect the course of operations there.

Lemnos was also the launching pad for the Greek capture of the Aegean islands of Psara, Imbros, Tenedos, Chios, Lesbos and Samothrace. The fate of these islands was the subject of prolonged diplomatic negotiations, as the Ottomans initially refused to cede them. Finally, in the Treaty of London, the fate of the islands was placed in the hands of the Great Powers, who in the event would cede them to Greece in February 1914, apart from the two closest to the Dardanelles, Imbros and Tenedos. Nevertheless, the Ottoman Empire was not reconciled to their loss, and a naval arms race followed, leading to a crisis in summer 1914 in which a new Greco-Turkish war appeared imminent; the crisis ended only through the outbreak of the First World War. During the First World War, the Entente in turn made use of Mudros Bay as a naval base for the Dardanelles Campaign in 1915. It was thus in the Armistice of Mudros that the Ottoman Empire capitulated to the Entente in 1918. The cession of Lemnos and the other islands to Greece was not finalized until the 1923 Treaty of Lausanne.

== Sources ==
- Erickson, Edward J. (2003). Defeat in Detail: The Ottoman Army in the Balkans, 1912–1913. Westport, CT: Greenwood. ISBN 0-275-97888-5.
- Fotakis, Zisis (2005). Greek Naval Strategy and Policy, 1910–1919. London: Routledge. ISBN 978-0-415-35014-3.
- Gianoulopoulos, Giannis (1999). Εξωτερική πολιτική [Foreign policy]. Ιστορία της Ελλάδας του 20ού αιώνα, Τόμος Α′: Οι Απαρχές 1900–1922 [History of Greece in the 20th Century, Volume I: Beginnings 1900–1922]. Vol. 2. Athens: Vivliorama. pp. 107–147. ISBN 960-8087-02-3.
- Hall, Richard C. (2000). The Balkan Wars, 1912–1913: Prelude to the First World War. London: Routledge. ISBN 0-415-22946-4.
- Kramers, J. H. (1936). "Limni". In Houtsma, M. Th.; Wensinck, A. J.; Lévi-Provençal, E.; Gibb, H. A. R.; Heffening, W. (eds.). The Encyclopaedia of Islam: A Dictionary of the Geography, Ethnography and Biography of the Muhammadan Peoples, Volume III: L–R. Leiden: E. J. Brill. pp. 27–28. OCLC 22923617.
- Papazoglou, K. (1929). "Λήμνος". Μεγάλη Στρατιωτικὴ καὶ Ναυτικὴ Ἐγκυκλοπαιδεία. Tόμος Τέταρτος: Καβάδης–Μωριάς [Great Military and Naval Encyclopaedia. Volume IV: Kavadh–Morea] (in Greek). Athens: Ἔκδοσις Μεγάλης Στρατιωτικῆς καὶ Ναυτικῆς Ἐγκυκλοπαιδείας. p. 352. OCLC 31255024.
- Επίτομη Ιστορία των Βαλκανικών Πολέμων 1912–1913 [Concise History of the Balkan Wars 1912–1913]. Athens: Hellenic Army General Staff, Army History Directorate. 1987. OCLC 51846788.
