= Hellenic Maritime Museum =

Coordinates: 37°55′57″N 23°38′45.3″E

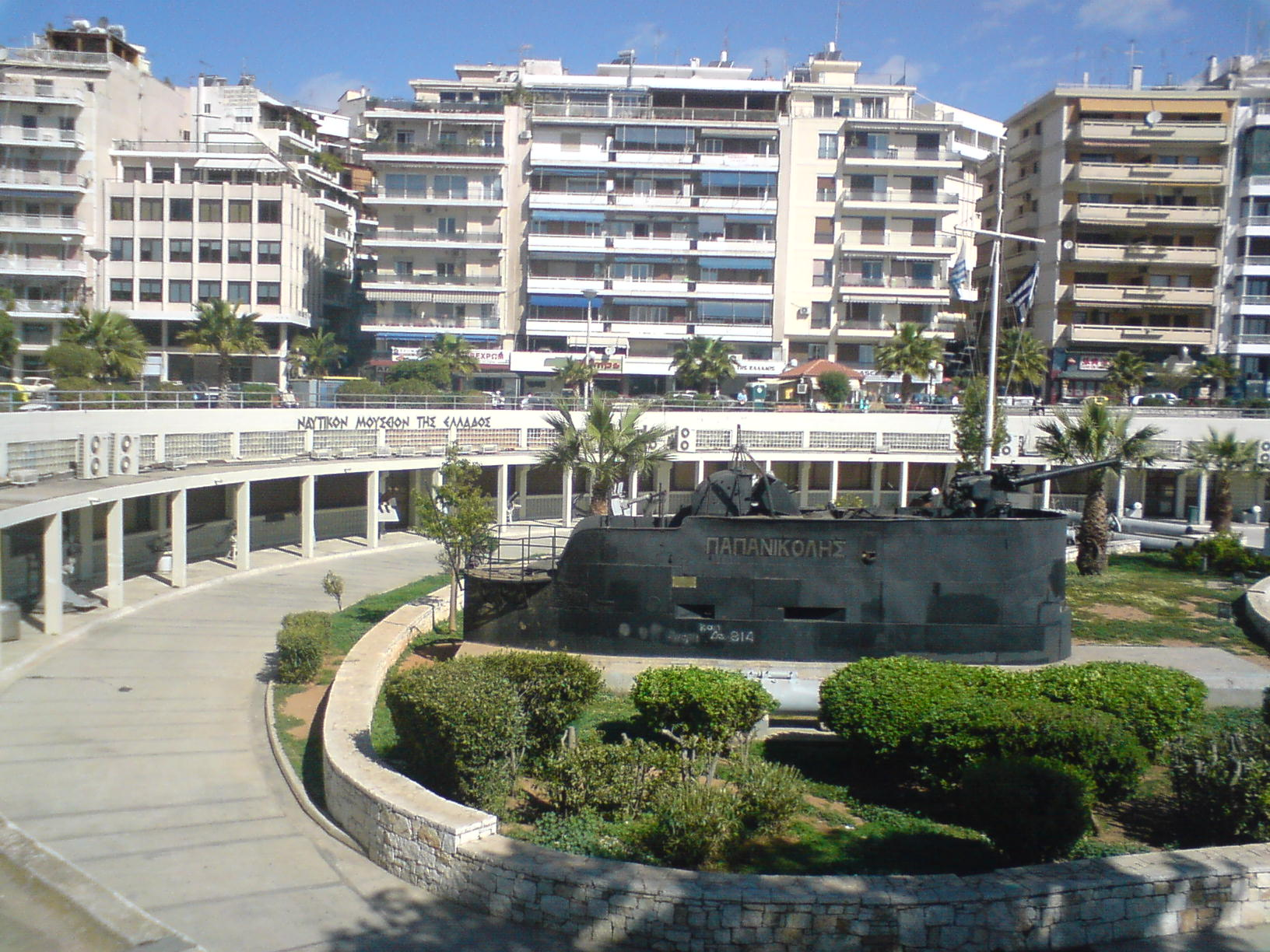
- Established: 1949
- Location: Akti Themistokleous – Freattyda; Nipolies, Athens, Greece
- Type: Maritime museum
- Website: www.hmmuseum.gr

The first attempt to establish the Hellenic Maritime Museum was in the newly established Greek state in 1867. That year the master of the Navy Gerasimos Zochios, founder of the Navy Retirement Fund, suggested that the Fund takes the task of collecting and conserving objects related to the Greek maritime history. For reasons relating to serious historical adventures of the time the idea was not positively received at the time. However, the idea was to be implemented as a private initiative, 82 years later. On April 7, 1949, a group of distinguished citizens of Piraeus together with officers of the Navy and Merchant Marine, sharing a love for the sea and ships, gathered in the office of the then Minister Gerasimos Vassiliadis and signed the memorandum of association under the name "Maritime Museum Society and collection of national relics at sea." It was the birth of the Maritime Museum and the first presidency was taken by the shipowner George Stringos.

The museum is located at Freatida, near Zea Harbour, in Piraeus and in its halls are exhibited more than 2,500 objects sorted chronologically and thematically, evoking the maritime history and tradition from prehistoric times to the present day. Its Naval Library is also open to the public during the days and hours of operation and consists of more than 17,000 volumes of books and magazines focusing on the naval history, science and art. In its exterior space sculptures and important outdoor exhibits are located such as the conning tower of the historic submarine "Papanikolis' and anchors of the ships of the time of the Battle of Navarino.

The museum exhibits approximately 2500 items related to the maritime history of Greece from prehistoric times to the present day and include many ship models and a number of paintings from the late 19th and early 20th centuries.

A member of:

ICOM (International Council of Museums) ICMM (International Congress of Maritime Museums AMMM (Association of Mediterranean Maritime Museums

The museum admits visitors from Tuesday to Saturday at 09:00-14:00. It is closed on Sunday, on Monday and on public holidays. Photography in the museum is prohibited.
