= Georgios Kakoulidis =

Greek soldier and politician (1871–1946)

- Γεώργιος Κακουλίδης
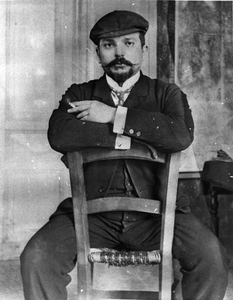
- Kakoulidis in Thessaloniki during the Macedonian Struggle

Member of Parliament for Kozani Prefecture
- In office 1936
- In office 1928–1929
- Monarch: George II
- President: Pavlos Kountouriotis
- Prime Minister: Eleftherios Venizelos; Konstantinos Demertzis; Ioannis Metaxas

Senator
- In office 1929–1935
- President: Pavlos Kountouriotis; Alexandros Zaimis
- Prime Minister: Eleftherios Venizelos

Minister Governor General of Thrace
- In office 1929–1930
- President: Pavlos Kountouriotis; Alexandros Zaimis
- Prime Minister: Eleftherios Venizelos

Personal details
- Born: 22 May [O.S. 10 May] 1871 Athens, Kingdom of Greece
- Died: 30 May 1946 Mykonos, Kingdom of Greece
- Party: Liberal Party
- Education: Hellenic Naval Academy
- Awards: War Cross
- Nickname(s): Kapetan Dragas; Καπετάν Δράγας

Military service
- Allegiance: Kingdom of Greece (Russia) Russian Empire; Provisional Government of National Defence
- Branch/service: Royal Hellenic Navy; Imperial Russian Navy (on secondment)
- Years of service: 1890–1921
- Rank: Vice Admiral
- Commands: Niki; Pineios; Evrotas; Sfendoni; Hydra; Panthir; Ierax; Averof; Chief of the Hellenic Navy General Staff
- Battles/wars: Greco-Turkish War (1897); Macedonian Struggle; Balkan Wars; First Balkan War; Battle of Elli; Battle of Lemnos; Second Balkan War; World War I; Mediterranean Theatre; Russian Civil War; Allied intervention in the Russian Civil War; Southern Front; Southern Russia Intervention; Greco-Turkish War (1919-1922); Occupation of Constantinople

Georgios Kakoulidis (Greek: Γεώργιος Κακουλίδης; 10/22 May 1871 – 30 May 1946) was a Hellenic Navy officer, who served as Chief of the Hellenic Navy General Staff, and later became a politician.

== Military career ==
He was born in Athens on 10 May 1871, entered the Hellenic Naval Academy on 23 July 1886, and graduated as a line ensign of the Royal Hellenic Navy on 8 August 1890.

He specialized in naval artillery, and repeatedly served on ships of the Imperial Russian Navy for further education. His first tenure abroad was in 1894–1897, during which he was promoted to sub-lieutenant, on 26 May 1895. He then participated in the Greco-Turkish War of 1897 aboard the ironclad warship Psara. Promoted to lieutenant on 24 March 1899, he left for another tour abroad in 1900–1902, followed by a stint as professor in the Navy Academy in 1903–1904.

He took part in the clandestine Macedonian Struggle, initially taking the guise of an animal trader called Christidis, in the area of Serres, but later taking command of his own armed band, with the nom de guerre of Kapetan Dragas (Καπετάν Δράγας). In 1907–08 he served abroad. In October 1909, he participated in the abortive coup of Lieutenant Konstantinos Typaldos-Alfonsatos. Promoted to lieutenant commander on 29 March 1910, he then commanded the destroyer Niki (1910), the gunboats Pineios and Evrotas (1910–11), and the destroyer Sfendoni (1911–12).

During the Balkan Wars of 1912–13, he served as first officer of the ironclad Hydra, taking part in the battles of Elli and Lemnos against the Ottoman navy, as well as the occupation of the islands of the eastern Aegean: Lemnos, Lesbos, and Thasos. He also took part in the mission of blockading the Ottoman cruiser Hamidiye in the Red Sea in April–May 1913.

Promoted to commander on 2 June 1913, he served as commander of the destroyers Panthir (1913–14) and Ierax (1914–15), while also serving as flotilla commodore of the four "Wild Beast"-class destroyers. On 7 February 1915, he was promoted to captain. In 1915, he briefly served as head of the Harbor Authorities Inspectorate.

During the National Schism, he supported Eleftherios Venizelos against the royal government in Athens. When the latter declared his "Provisional Government of National Defence" in Thessaloniki, on 11 November 1916, Kakoulidis with ten men boarded the ironclad Hydra, and with the assistance of its captain, Ioannis Vratsanos, took control of the ship. The mutineers sailed the ship to the nearby French naval squadron, and thence sailed to Thessaloniki, where they joined the Provisional Government's forces. Kakoulidis served as head of the Provisional Government's naval forces until 1917, when Greece was reunified under Venizelos.

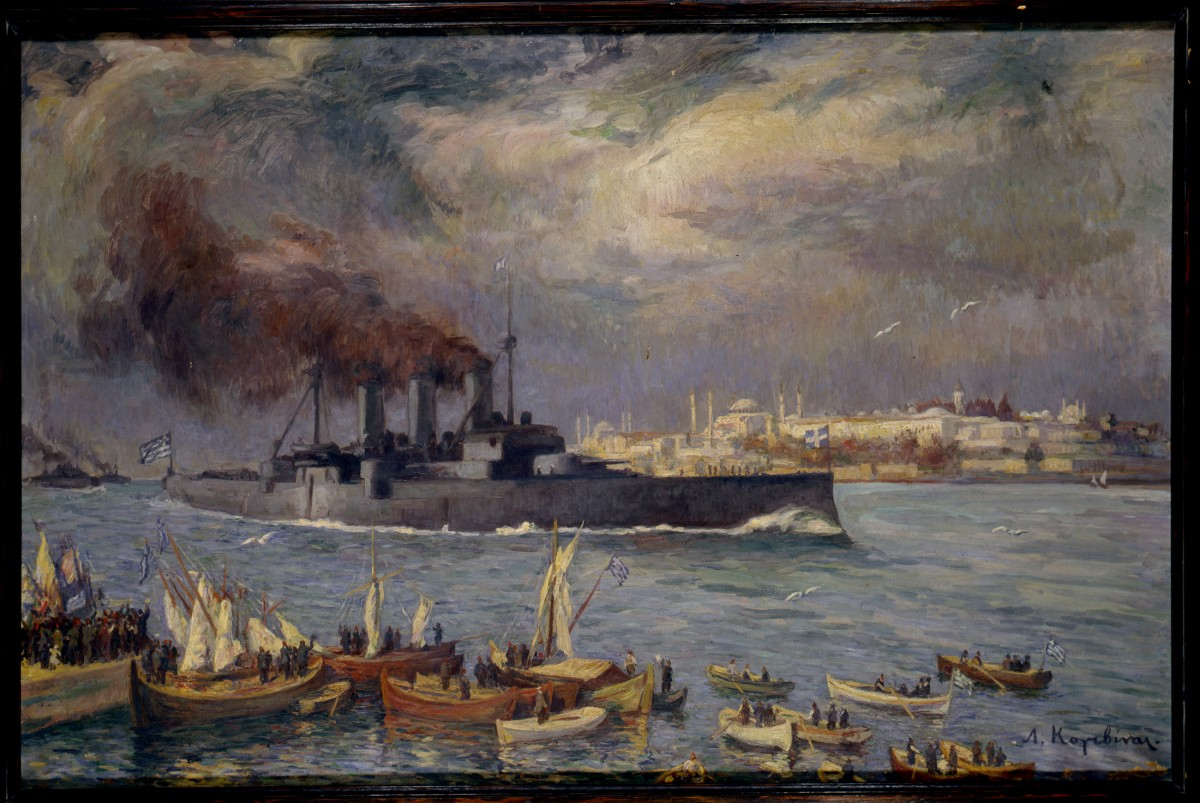
The Averof entering the Bosporus

With the formal entry of the country into the First World War, he served as Commander of the Light Fleet (1918), and subsequently of the Battleship Squadron (1918–19), being promoted to rear admiral on 8 March 1919. From this position, he participated with his flagship, Averof, in the Allied occupation of Constantinople in November 1918, and in the Allied intervention in Southern Russia in 1919. On 18 January 1919, he was awarded the Greek War Cross 2nd Class, for his services during the First World War.

During the subsequent Asia Minor Campaign, he served as Chief of the Navy General Staff, until being appointed Greek representative in the Allied advisory commission on naval affairs later in 1920. After the electoral victory of the royalist parties in November 1920, he was suspended from active service on 26 April 1921, and retired on 30 September 1921. On 12 February 1925, he was promoted retroactively to vice admiral in retirement, the appointment backdated to 6 October 1921.

== Political career ==
After his retirement, Kakoulidis entered politics in Kozani, being elected as a representative to the IV National Assembly in 1924–25, and then an MP in 1926–1928, Senator in 1929–1935, and again MP in 1936, always with Venizelos' Liberal Party. In 1929–1930, he was Minister Governor-General of Thrace in the Venizelos cabinets.

Georgios Kakoulidis died at Mykonos on 30 May 1946.
