= Hierax =

Hierax (Ancient Greek: Ἱέραξ) may refer to:

- Hierax (Spartan admiral), Spartan commander in the Corinthian War
- Hierax (ascetic), learned Egyptian ascetic living during the 3rd century
- Antiochus Hierax, Seleucid prince
- Hierax (mythology), a Greek mythological figure
- Hierax (Platonist), Middle Platonist philosopher

== See also ==
- Greek ship Ierax
