= ARA Tucumán =

At least two ships of the Argentine Navy have been named ARA Tucumán:

- ARA Tucumán (1911), a San Luis-class destroyer originally ordered by Argentina that was purchased by Greece (as Leon) in 1912 before delivery
- ARA Tucumán (E-5), a Mendoza-class destroyer launched in 1928 and decommissioned in 1962.
