= Greek ship Leon =

At least two ships of the Hellenic Navy have borne the name Leon (Greek: Λέων, "lion"):

- Greek destroyer Leon (1912) an Aetos-class destroyer acquired in 1912 and sunk in 1941.
- Greek destroyer Leon (D54) a Cannon-class destroyer escort launched in 1943 as USS Eldridge she was transferred to Greece in 1951 and renamed. She was scrapped in 1999.
