= Greek destroyer Aetos (1912) =

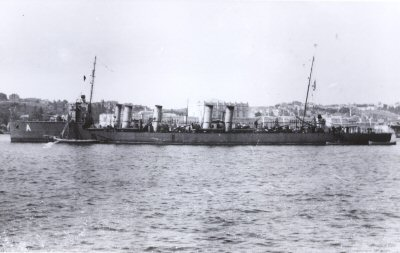
- Destroyer Aetos

History

Greece
- Name: Aetos; Α/Τ Άετός
- Namesake: eagle
- Builder: Cammell Laird, Birkenhead
- Laid down: 1911
- Launched: 19 September 1911
- Acquired: 1912
- Commissioned: 1912
- Decommissioned: 1945
- Fate: Broken up

General characteristics
- Class & type: Aetos-class destroyer
- Displacement: 880 tons standard
- Length: 89.4 m (293 ft)
- Beam: 8.3 m (27 ft)
- Draft: 3 m (9.8 ft)
- Propulsion: 5 × Foster Wheeler boilers (4 coal-fired and 1 oil-fired), replaced by Yarrow oil-fired boilers in 1925; 5 funnels; combined Parsons and Curtis steam turbines
- Speed: 31 knots (57 km/h) maximum (32 knots (59 km/h) after 1925)
- Complement: 58
- Armament: As completed: 4 × 4 in (100 mm)/50 guns; 1 × 3 in (76 mm) anti-aircraft gun; 6 × 21-inch (533 mm) torpedo tubes; 3 × electric search lights; 1925: 76.2 mm gun removed; 37 mm anti-aircraft gun added; four-barrel 40 mm (1.6 in) gun added; 2 mortars added; Modified for laying 40 mines; 1942: 3rd and 4th stern torpedo launchers removed; 1 × 3-inch (76 mm) anti-aircraft gun added; 1 × 20 mm Oerlikon gun added; A/S type 123A detection device added

Aetos (Greek: Α/Τ Άετός, "Eagle") was an Aetos-class destroyer which served in the Royal Hellenic Navy from 1912 to 1945.

== Origin ==
The ship, along with her three sister ships Ierax, Panthir, and Leon, had originally been ordered by Argentina from the English shipyard Cammell Laird in Birkenhead. Aetos was originally named San Luis.

== Greek purchase ==
The four ships were purchased in 1912 by Greece, ready for delivery, each for the sum of £148,000, when the Balkan Wars seemed likely. They were sailed with a non-Greek crew to Algiers, to meet the requisitioned personnel transport ship Ionia, which held the Greek crews for the ships. When Aetos entered the Mediterranean, she went adrift due to a serious engine breakdown. By pure coincidence, one of the other destroyers passed nearby and towed Aetos to Algiers.

== Service history ==
During the Balkan Wars, the Royal Hellenic Navy purchased only the minimum amount of ammunition. Torpedoes were not available for this class of ship, so these ships were initially named "scouts" rather than "destroyers". She was under the command of Commander A. Douroutis, RHN.

During the First World War, Greece belatedly entered the war on the side of the Triple Entente. Due to Greece's neutrality, the four Aetos-class ships were seized by the Allies in October 1916, taken over by the French in November, and served in the French Navy from 1917 to 1918. By 1918, they were back on escort duty under Greek colors, mainly in the Aegean Sea.

Aetos participated in the evacuation of Greeks from Russia during the Russian Civil War in 1918 and saw action in the Greco-Turkish War (1919-1922) in the Sea of Marmara and the Aegean Sea.

After the war, Aetos was extensively rebuilt by the J Samuel White yard from 1925 to 1927 and emerged as a much more modern unit. Four Yarrow boilers replaced her five original units with five funnels reduced to two. This allowed the bridge to be moved further aft, reducing spray and allowing a deckhouse to be built forward of it for a super-firing 4-inch gun. One more gun between the funnels and one on the quarterdeck aft with two single pom pom guns completed the armament. Torpedo tubes were increased to two triple mounts, and a Vickers director fire control was fitted.

Aetos participated in the Second World War. After surviving the German invasion of Greece in April 1941, Aetos served under the operational control of the Royal Navy based in the Indian Ocean, where despite her age, she served with distinction. Further modifications included new antiaircraft guns, and antisubmarine weapons. After the end of the Second World War, Aetos was stricken in 1945.

== See also ==
- History of the Hellenic Navy
