= Greek ship Panthir =

At least two ships of the Hellenic Navy have borne the name Panthir (Greek: Πάνθηρ, "panther"):

- Greek destroyer Panthir (1912), an Aetos-class destroyer acquired in 1912 and stricken in 1946.
- Greek destroyer Panthir (D67), a Cannon-class destroyer escort launched in 1943 as USS Garfield Thomas she was transferred to Greece in 1951 and renamed. She was sunk as a target in 2000.
