= Wild Beast-class destroyer =

Two classes of Greek destroyers were known as the Wild Beast (Greek: Θηρία) class:

- Wild Beast-class destroyer (1912)
- Wild Beast-class destroyer (1951)
