= Malaya Force =

Japanese naval divisions

- Part of the Pacific War and the Second World War
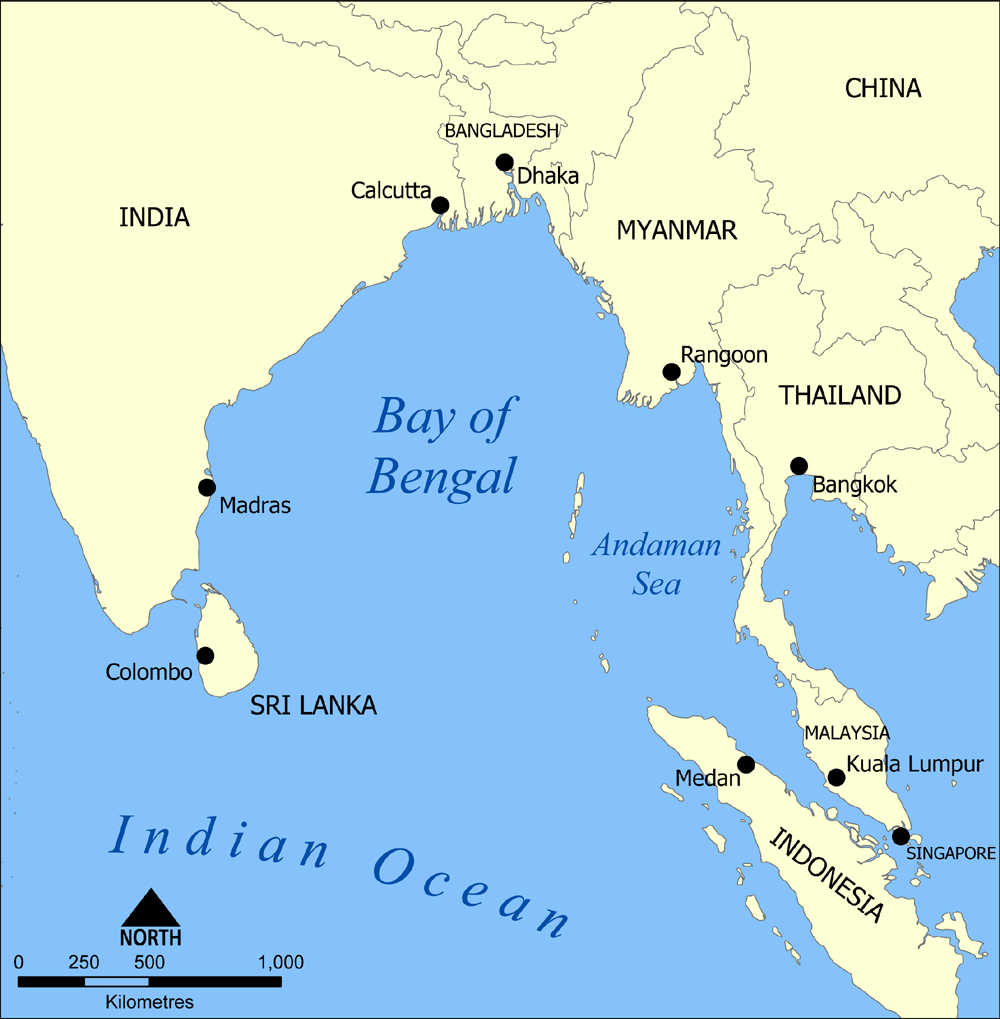
- The Bay of Bengal, site of the raid by Malaya Force
| Date | 1–11 April 1942 |
| Location | Bay of Bengal, Indian Ocean 20°S 80°E |
| Result | Japanese victory |

Belligerents
| (Empire of Japan) Japan | United Kingdom; Netherlands; United States; Norway |

Commanders and leaders
| Jisaburō Ozawa; Takeo Kurita | |

Units involved
| (Empire of Japan) Malaya Force | 5 Squadron RAF (2 Mohawk Mk IV); 6th Coast Defence Flight, IAF (1 Wapiti) |

Strength
| 1 light aircraft carrier; 5 heavy cruisers; 1 light cruiser; 4 destroyers | |

Casualties and losses
| Nil | 139 merchant sailors killed; 20 Merchant ships sunk; 3 damaged |

The Imperial Japanese Navy dispatched Malaya Force (Vice Admiral Jisaburō Ozawa) consisting of the aircraft carrier Ryūjō, six cruisers, a light cruiser and four destroyers on a raid in the northern Bay of Bengal (1–11 April 1942) concurrent with Operation C in April 1942 against British Ceylon (now Sri Lanka) and the Eastern Fleet. The force departed from Mergui (now Myeik, Myanmar) on 1 April.

The Eastern Fleet was far to the south, beyond British Ceylon, operating against the Indian Ocean raid. The British were incapable of defending the merchant ships in the Bay, having only a few aircraft, a couple of Indian sloops and the Greek destroyer Ierax. Merchant ships were been ordered to sail in small groups and hug the coast.

On 5 April, Malaya Force divided into three groups to search for targets south of False Point and Cocanada (now Kakinada) in India. On 5 April, aircraft from Ryūjō sank a ship and on 6 April, Calcutta (Kolkata) having ordered ships to disperse on 31 March, cancelled sailings. Aircraft bombed Cocanada and Vizagapatnam (Visakhapatnam) causing minor damage and an exodus. Malaya Force sank 20 merchant ships and damaged three more of over 130,000 GRT before returning to base on 11 April.

== Background ==
=== Japanese plan ===
Vice Admiral Jisaburō Ozawa proposed a raid against shipping to and from Calcutta (now Kolkata) at the north end of the Bay of Bengal that would also protect the forthcoming invasion of the Andaman Islands. After the operational order on 9 March for Operation C against Ceylon (now Sri Lanka and the Eastern Fleet, Ozawa suggested that his operation be combined with Operation C. Admiral Nobutake Kondō, the commander of the 2nd Fleet accepted the proposal on 14 March, provided that the Malaya Force stayed in the northern Bay of Bengal and waited east of the 85th meridian east until Operation C had begun, to preserve secrecy.

The attacks of Operation C were planned to begin on 5 April; on 17 March Ozawa issued the orders for Malaya Force to attack Allied shipping in the Bay of Bengal and to sink any Royal Navy and Indian Navy ships that could be found. Beginning on 2 April, most of the force was to depart from Mergui (now Myeik, Myanmar) on the south Burma coast and sail west to the north of the Andaman Islands. In the Bay, at mid-day on 3 April, the 11th Destroyer Division, Fubuki, Hatsuyuki, Murakumo and Shirayuki that were to patrol the waters off Port Blair in the Andaman Islands detached from Malaya Force but the flagship of the 11th Destroyer Division, the light cruiser Yura, would remain with Malaya Force. The Supply Unit (Hokyū Butai) with the tanker MV Nishiei Maru and its destroyer escorts Ayanami and Shiokaze, would also wait near Port Blair. As the 11th Destroyer Division detached, the 20th Destroyer Division, comprising Amagiri, Ayanami, Shiokaze and Shirakumo was to pass by the Andaman Islands and join Malaya Force.

Malaya Force deployment points

At 21:00 on 4 April., the force was to reach Point C, 16°N, 86°40′E, where Northern Force, with the heavy cruisers Kumano and Suzuya and the destroyer Shirakumo, would head north during the night to reach Point D, 19°20′N, 87°30′E, at 09:00 on 5 April. If no British ships were waiting in ambush, Northern Force would move to Point E, 18°20′N, 85°E, on the sea lane between Madras and Calcutta and cut the supply line to Burma by sinking as many Allied merchant ships as could be found. Central Force with the light carrier Ryūjō, the heavy cruiser Chōkai, the light cruiser Yura and the destroyers Asagiri and Yūgiri. would move westwards ready to support the northern or southern force as necessary around Point E, where many ships were anticipated.

The Southern Force, with the cruisers Mikuma, Mogami and the destroyer Amagiri, was to be at Point F, 15°30′N, 83°20′E, to cut the southern part of the supply corridor. On the day after the attack on Ceylon the forces would rally at Point G, 16°30′N, 85°40′E, for the return journey to Mergui, passing south of the Andaman Islands, the 11 Destroyer Division rejoining. If the Kidō Butai decided on a change plan, Malaya Force was to stay west of the Andaman Islands and continue its raid.

=== British preparations ===
==== Bay of Bengal ====
In the Bay of Bengal, the British had only a couple of Royal Indian Navy sloops and the Greek destroyer Ierax for trade protection; merchant ships sailed in small unescorted groups, hugging the coast.

==== Ceylon ====
Reinforcement of the Eastern Fleet depended on transfers from Britain and the Mediterranean. In late December 1941, a reassessment of the threat posed by Japan envisioned the Navy transferring the many of its big ships to the Eastern Fleet. Matters were made urgent by the Attack on Pearl Harbor that sank much of the United States Pacific Fleet and exposed British Malaya to attack. American reinforcement of the Atlantic and the pre-war rearmament was beginning to yield more big ships for transfer to the Far East but the Mediterranean Fleet sent far less reinforcements than expected, due to its losses in late 1941. Admiral James Somerville assumed command of an Eastern Fleet in March 1942 that was smaller than envisioned in December 1941.

Somerville divided the fleet into a fast Force A comprising the aircraft carriers HMS Formidable and HMS Indomitable, the modernised battleship HMS Warspite (flagship) the modern heavy cruisers HMS Cornwall and HMS Dorsetshire, the light cruisers HMS Emerald and HMS Enterprise, with six destroyers. Force B was formed around the old carrier HMS Hermes and four un-modernised Revenge-class battleships, HMS Ramillies, HMS Resolution, HMS Revenge and HMS Royal Sovereign, the old light cruisers HMS Caledon, HMS Dragon and the Dutch Jacob van Heemskerck, with eight Australian, British and Dutch destroyers, plus several submarines. The ships had not operated together and ship and air crews were deficient in training.

==== Signals intelligence ====
The Far East Combined Bureau (FECB) intelligence assessment of the strength of the Japanese force was mistaken, identifying only two carriers in the Japanese force. FECB also believed the Japanese would sail from Staring Bay on 21 March and that C Day was 1 April. Somerville planned to evade the Japanese during the day and close for torpedo attacks at night with radar-equipped Fairey Albacore torpedo-bombers. Somerville had orders from the Admiralty, to protect the communications in the Indian Ocean and to keep the Eastern Fleet in being by avoiding risks but sailed to attack the Japanese force, having been convinced by the FECB that its assessment was accurate.

== Prelude ==
Bay of Bengal location map

Beginning on 25 March the Tōkō Kaigun Kōkūtai (Imperial Japanese Navy Air Service) was made responsible for air reconnaissance over the Bay of Bengal. Daily sorties were flown by three to five flying boats from Port Blair in the Andaman Islands, out as far as 150 nmi (280 km; 170 mi) east of the Indian coast. The sorties were intended to uncover British intentions, after they had sent Hudson bombers over the Andaman Islands, alarming the commander of the 22nd Air Flotilla in Bangkok.

On 29 March he transferred ten fighters from Tavoy (now Dawei) that flew daily patrols for four days, deterring the Hudson bombers from prowling over the islands.Reconnaissance reports showed that an offensive operation by the Eastern Fleet was not likely and that Operation U, the transfer of army divisions to Rangoon could continue. After concentrating the force at Mergui in Burma, Ozawa departed at 11:00 on 1 April and sailed south of the Tavoy Islands in the estuary of the river Dawei. At 13:00 the force turned south-west to pass between the Andaman Islands and the Nicobar Islands further south.

== Raid ==
=== 5 April ===
On 5 April, at 16°N, 88°E, Malaya Force divided into North, Centre and South forces, to search for targets south of False Point (20°20′N, 86°44′E) and Cocanada (now Kakinada) (16°57′N, 82°15′E). Northern Force comprised the cruisers Kumano, Suzuya and the destroyer Shirakumo. Centre Force consisted of the aircraft carrier Ryūjō, the cruisers Chōkai and Yura with the destroyers Asagiri and Yūgiri. Southern Force was made up of the cruisers Mikuma, Mogami and the destroyer Amagiri.

=== 6 April ===
==== Northern Force ====
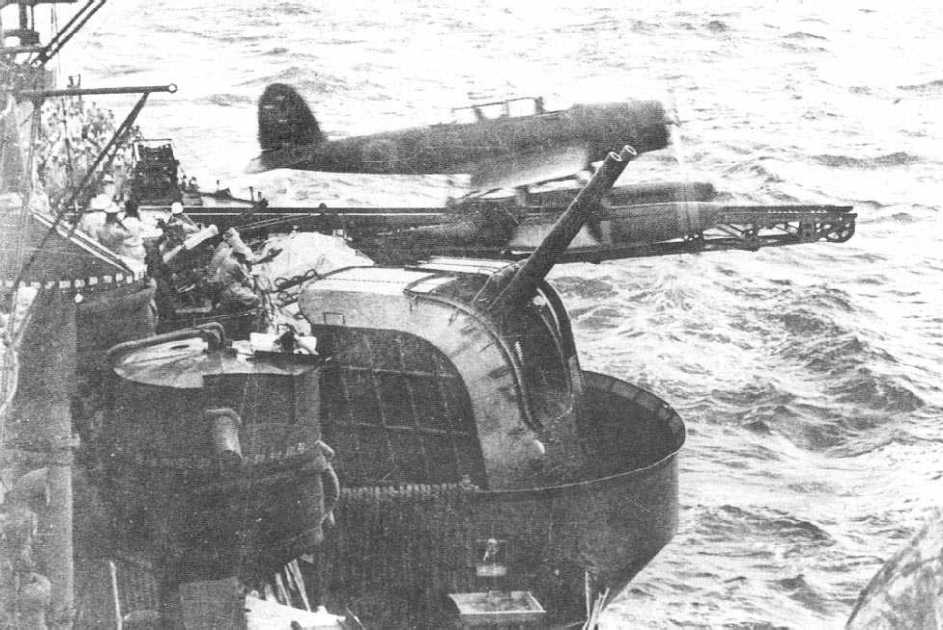
Example of a Aichi E13A (Jake) reconnaissance aircraft being catapulted

Northern Force had commenced its advance towards the coast at 06:00 on 5 April, then Kumano and Suzuya launched a Aichi E13A (Type 1) [Jake] seaplane each, to find targets. At 06:27 reported a merchant ship on a bearing of 320°, on a heading of 150°. The pilot, Lieutenant Itō Motoe then reported a tanker 6 nmi (11 km; 6.9 mi) south of the freighter. At 06:38, the force commander, Vice-Admiral Takeo Kurita, ordered the Northern Force to sink both ships but soon afterwards, news arrived of six more ships on a bearing of 295°.

At 09:52 the Japanese ships opened fire on the northern-most ship at 4.4 nmi; 8.2 km (8,200 m) and soon set it on fire, then changed target to the six merchant ships that were on a bearing of 290°. The ships had left Sandheads, off Calcutta, at 18:00 on 5 April. Kumano and Shirakumo moved to the starboard flank and Suzuya manoeuvred to the south to cut off the ships. The freighters were sunk by 08:50, Kumano having fired 333 rounds of 203 mm and 186 rounds of 127 mm ammunition. Suzuya fired 190 shells of 203 mm and 64 shells of 127 mm. Shirakumo fired 200 rounds from its 127 mm guns. The bombardments were fired at 5,000 to 6,000 m (16,000 to 20,000 ft) with great accuracy because Itō observed the fall of shot.

At about 10:00, when Itō was returning from his sortie, he signalled that three Hurricane fighters had attacked him (actually, two Mohawk Mk IVs of 5 Squadron) on reconnaissance from RAF Cuttack along the coast. A New Zealand pilot, Flight-Lieutenant Keith McEwan, saw the Jake seaplane of Kumano preparing to take off about 3 nmi (5.6 km; 3.5 mi) away and dived between Kumano and Shirakumo, fired about 600 rounds then got out of range of the cruisers. McEwan claimed the seaplane shot down but at 10:13 it landed to be hoisted aboard Kumano. At 12:16 the force completed its attack and turned to 180° to steam to Point G, the rendezvous at 16°30′N, 85°40′E. On 6 April, Kurita claimed eight freighters but had only sunk seven ships. At 06:00, crew on Elsa, a Norwegian tanker of 5,381 GRT, heading from Madras to Calcutta with 7,000 long tons (7,100 t) of paraffin saw three ship silhouettes that turned out to be Japanese ships that opened fire. The crew abandoned the ship in life rafts as Elsa was hit and caught fire. One member of the crew of 30 was killed and several wounded.

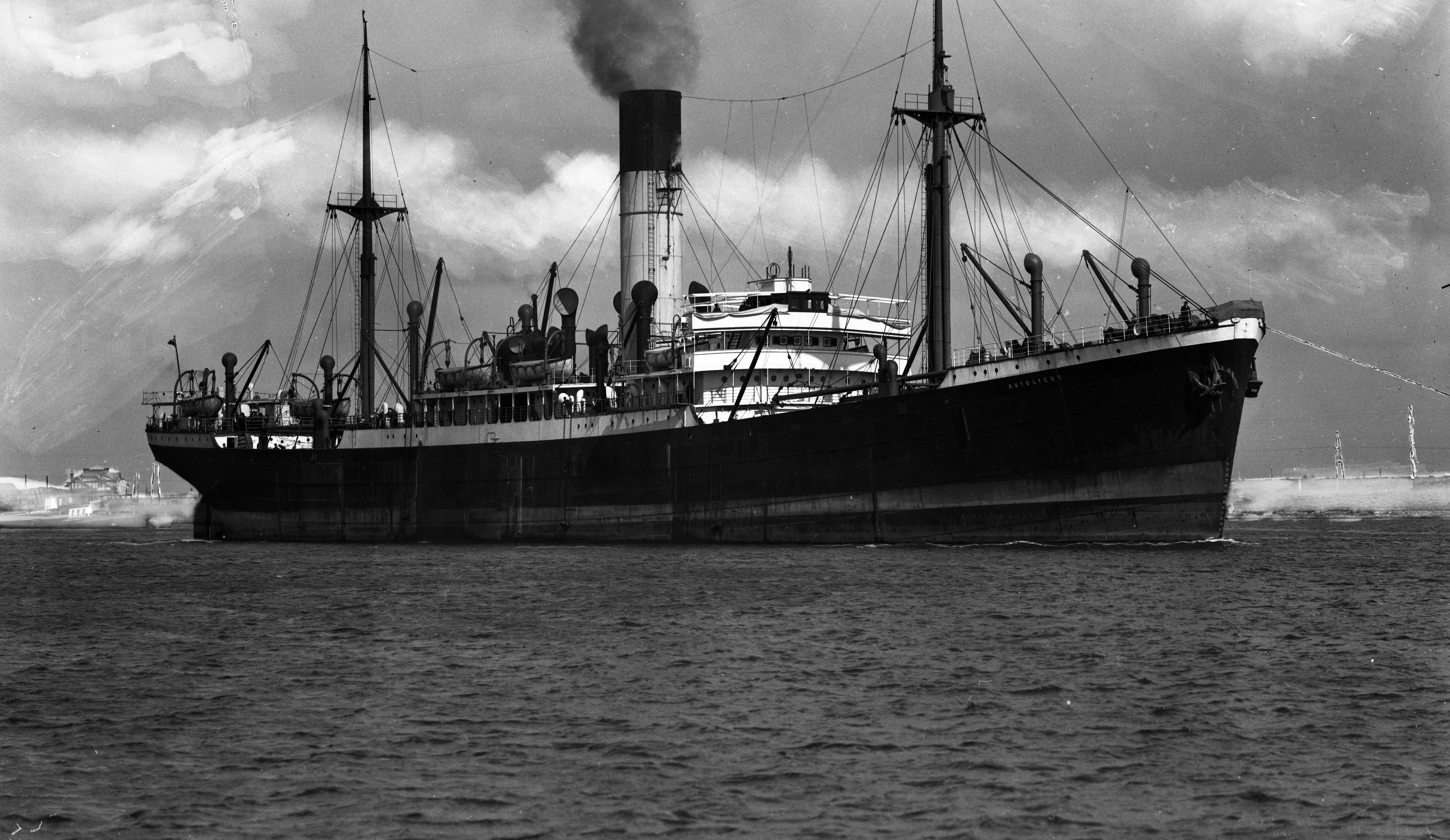
Pre-war photograph of SS Autolycus

A British merchant ship, SS Malda of 9,066 GRT, en route to Colombo was sunk with the loss of 25 members of the 154 crew. SS Autolycus, a British 7,621 GRT merchant ship, was sailing to Britain from Calcutta and Durban. The survivors reached land in Orissa Province on 8 April, with the loss of 16 members of the crew. SS Indora a British 6,622 GRT was sailing to Mauritius when it was sunk with the loss of two men from its 83 crew. The US steamer SS Exmoor (4,986 GRT) was heading for Colombo with 3,800 long tons (3,900 t) of goods until sunk at 09:15 with no casualties as was SS Silksworth another British ship of 4,921 GRT, also with no casualties. On the British 2,441-GRT merchant ship SS Shinkuang three men were killed in the sinking.

==== Central Force ====
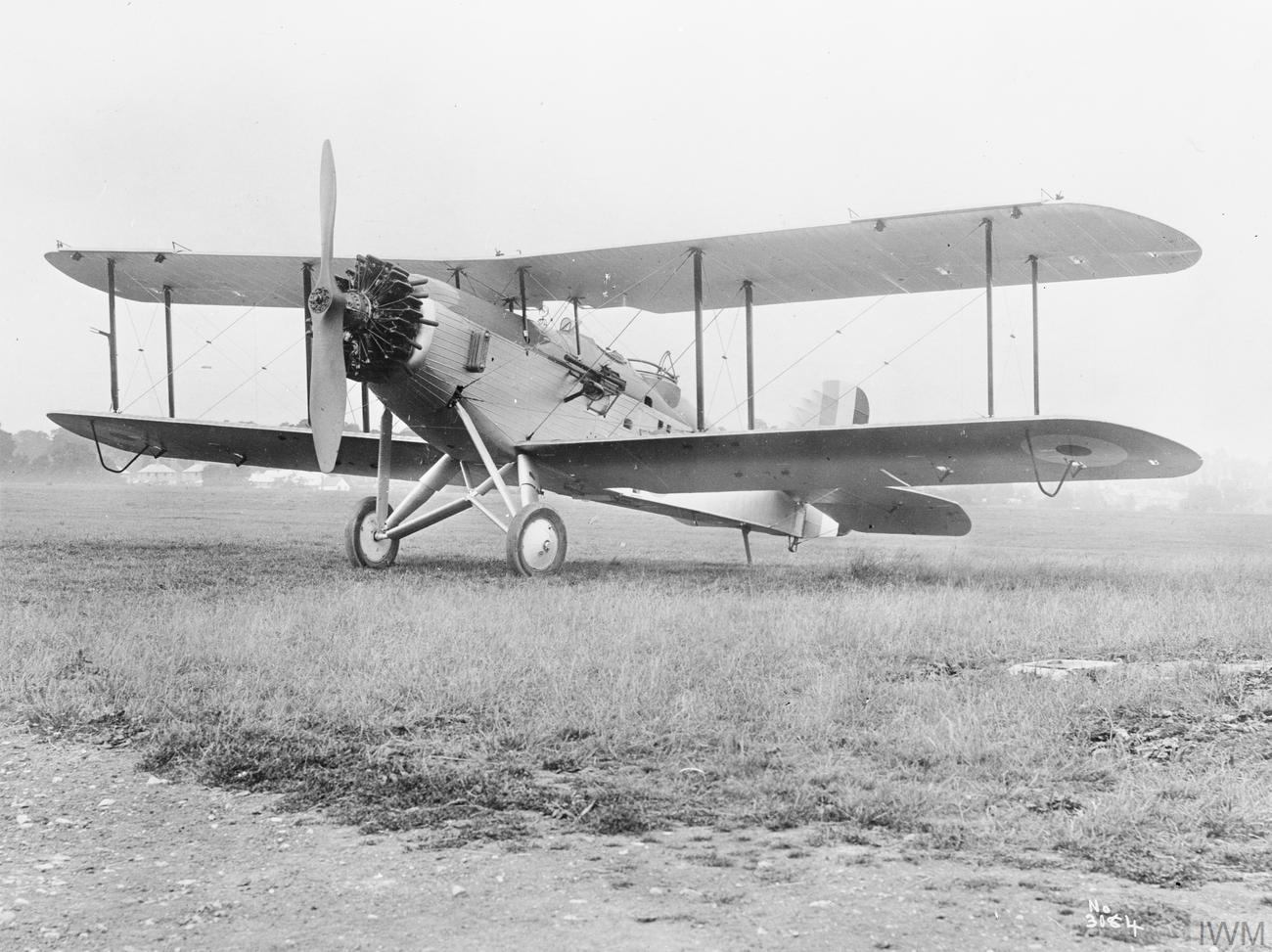
Example of a Westland Wapiti

At 06:00 four Kates took off for Vizagapatnam anticipating many ships to be in the harbour. Two Kates carried four 130 lb (60 kg) bombs and the other two with a 500 lb (230 kg) bomb with the four 130 lb (60 kg) bombs. The Kates flew north, parallel to the coast to avoid Flak and two seaplanes were catapulted off Chōkai to reconnoitre British shipping. After about thirty minutes a Westland Wapiti of the 6th Coast Defence Flight, Indian Air Force (Volunteer Reserve) spotted the Japanese ships and got off a sighting report of an aircraft carrier, a battleship, a light cruiser and two destroyers at 17°40′N, 83°50′E on a heading of 35°. The British commanders realised that a second raiding force was loose in the Indian Ocean, about 20 nmi (37 km; 23 mi) off Vizagapatnam and with the Eastern Fleet busy south of Ceylon, they could only warn merchant vessels in the area of the danger.

At 06:44 Chōkai claimed the sinking of a British 15,000 GRT ship by bombardment and at 06:54 Yura, Asagiri and Yūgiri reported the sinking of an 11,000 GRT Dutch ship. Around 08:45, Ozawa had received reports of the sinking of another six merchant ships and the damaging of two more, the ships reportedly being British, Dutch and US ships of 3,000 to 9,000 GRT. Before long, torpedo bombers from Ryūyō claimed to have sunk a cargo ship and damaged two more, all their torpedoes hitting the targets. Ozawa dispatched five more Kates to Vizagapatnam at 09:20, two with torpedoes and three carrying the 500 lb (230 kg) and four 130 lb (60 kg) bomb-load, claiming a ship with one torpedo hit and several near misses. At 10:30 two Kates with torpedoes took off for a position 150 nmi (280 km; 170 mi) out at 150°, expecting to find large ships, followed by the landing of four Kates from the earlier raids, reporting that they had received machine-gun fire but no damage was recorded.

The passivity of the British led to five more Kates taking off at 11:43, carrying the 500 lb (230 kg) and four 130 lb (60 kg) bomb-load for another attack on Vizagapatnam, returning at 13:00 with one aircraft slightly damaged, to be refuelled and rearmed and back in the air after thirty minutes, three with the 500 lb (230 kg) and four 130 lb (60 kg) bombs and two Kates, each with a 1,800 lb (800 kg) bomb. The Kates returned from Vizagapatnam at 14:30 and claimed severe damage to a 2,000 GRT ship, fuel storage tanks and an ammunition store. About an hour later a pair of Kates returned and reported making a torpedo attack on an auxiliary ship but had failed to attain a hit. The latest raid on Vizagapatnam returned at 16:00 and claimed serious damage to two merchant ships with near misses. With a couple of hours to sunset, Ozawa sent a last raid to Vizagapatnam consisting of five Kates carrying the 500 lb (230 kg) and four 130 lb (60 kg) bomb-load. The Kates were at the port within half an hour and back by 18:30. Central Force turned south at 11:38 and at 16:35 after the last raid to Vizagapatnam had been dispatched, Ozawa turned the ships towards the port to help the bombers find the carrier. After the Kates had been taken back on board, the force turned to the south-east and by midnight on 6/7 April, was about 100 nmi (190 km; 120 mi) from the Indian coast.

The US merchant ship SS Selma City (5,686 GRT) sailing from Colombo to Calcutta, was attacked by a seaplane from Chōkai at about 06:45 and a bomb hit flooded the engine room and around 11:30 the captain ordered the abandon ship and then two Kates appeared and hit the ship with several bombs, the hulk sinking on the next day, two of the crew being wounded. The 2,073 GRT Dutch freighter, SS Van der Capellen, was heading for Bombay with 1,170 long tons (1,190 t) of stores but had engine trouble in the early hours, only getting under way at 07:00. At 09:00 a seaplane was seen, quickly followed by two bombers that claimed the ship as seriously damaged but the attack succeeded in sinking the ship at 18°20′N, 84°18′E. SS Taksang, a 3,471 GRT British ship, was sunk by Yura and Yūgiri at 07:45 at 17°52′N, 84°40′E with the loss of 15 men of the crew of 122, including survivors from SS Harpassa sunk the day before, many of its crew reaching the shore in lifeboats. The US vessel, SS Bienville (5,491 GRT) carrying 2,500 long tons (2,500 t) of manganese, 5,000 long tons (5,100 t) of jute and 500 monkeys for scientific experiments, when the crew saw two aircraft that dropped four bombs, one hitting and causing a fire, the other three near-missing and damaging the hull, making steering difficult; Chōkai sank the ship with gunfire.

SS Ganges (6246 GRT) heading to Madras with 7,000 long tons (7,100 t) of cargo, was attacked by an aircraft at 07:00 that dropped a bomb that missed. A few minutes later, lookouts spotted a destroyer and two bombers. The bombers achieved one hit that started a fire and when this got out of control, the captain ordered abandon ship. The evacuation was interrupted by the destroyer, two cruisers and an aircraft carrier that bombarded the ship then turned north. Ganges sank at 08:40 at 17°48′N, 84°09′E, eleven men of the crew of 56 having been killed. The British 2,646 GRT freighter, SS Sinkiang, also en route to Colombo was attacked by an aeroplane that dropped a bomb and made off. At 08:11 Sinkiang transmitted a distress message and that an aircraft carrier had been seen. Another message that a cruiser was approaching and after another ten minutes signalled that the ship was sinking, British records having the ship sunk by bombing and naval bombardment at 17°32′N, 82°50′E.

==== Invasion scare ====
The Indian Coromandel Coast

The air attacks on Cocanada and Vizegepatnam set off a panic. In Madras, the governor, Sir Arthur Hope, was told by the local military authorities, that a Japanese invasion was expected 'south of Masulipatnam' on the Coromandel Coast, north of Madras. The Governor appealed for people who were not essential workers to leave Madras, along with government offices and staff, to move inland. From 8 to 14 April, approximately 200,000 people fled. The Japanese invasion of Burma had succeeded by April 1942 and the Bay of Bengal was closed to maritime traffic, the east coast trade was sent to Bombay, Karachi, Cochin and the other west coast ports.

At dusk, the Kates claimed serious damage to a 6,500 GRT freighter and to a ship of 2,500 GRT. During the day, Central Force claimed eight sinkings, three ships by Chōkai, three by Yura and its destroyers and two by the Kates from Ryūjō. The 1,279 GRT Dutch freighter Banjoewangi was sailing for Karachi in north-west India (now Pakistan) and was thought to have been sunk by Yura and its destroyers at 06:55 at 17°35′N, 83°45′E with 13 crew killed. The Dutch Batavia, sister-ship to Banjoewangi, also 1,279 GRT and heading for Karachi, was sunk by Yura and Yūgiri at 08:45 at 18°12′N, 84°21′E, four members of the crew being killed.

==== Southern Force ====
The force took post at 06:15, Mikuma and Mogami each launched a seaplane to reconnoitre for ships and aircraft. Two vessels were found at 07:30 and the cruisers closed to attack them, later claiming to have sunk five merchant ships of 5,000–7,000 GRT, reporting that many Lascar crewmen and a few Europeans made for the coast. The operation ended at 15:00 and the ships turned to a course of 100° to rejoin Malaya Force on 7 April. Southern Force sank the 7,726 GRT Dardanus that had been damaged earlier and was under tow by Gandara (5,281 GRT). The ships were seen by one of the seaplanes that bombed the ships but missed, only for Southern Force to arrive and bombard them. Amagiri fired three torpedoes that sank both ships. Mikuma fired 120 203 mm (8.0 in) shells and 22 127 mm (5.0 in) rounds, Mogami fired 137 203 mm (8.0 in) and 47 127 mm (5.0 in) and Amagiri fired 78 127 mm (5.0 in) shells and three torpedoes.

Fifteen of the crew of 79 on Gandara were killed and no record exists of losses on Dardanus. A distress signal had been transmitted but the shore authorities were unable to help and had to wait for the Japanese ships to depart. The Norwegian ship Dagfred, en route to Madras from Calcutta was seen around 09:00 by Mikuma and Mogami 14 nmi (26 km; 16 mi) off the coast. The crew were ordered to abandon ship and the cruisers commenced firing. The ship was severely damaged in less than ten minutes, sinking soon after, the ship being strafed by the cruiser seaplanes but there were no casualties. As the ships steamed past at speed, none of the crew were arrested. Another Norwegian ship, Hermod, sailing from Calcutta to Colombo was sunk at 10:15; the crew survived to get to shore in three lifeboats, watched by the seaplanes, that refrained from firing.

=== Akyab ===
On 5 April, at the eastern side of the Bay, off Akyab (now Sittwe) in Burma at 20°7′N, 92°54′E, the Burmese coastal forces and Calcutta in India, were attacked by Nell land-based bombers, flying from the former RAF Mingaladon. The bomber crews claimed a 2,000 GRT minelayer (itturned out to be HMIS Indus, a Grimsby-class sloop that suffered ten men wounded). The bombers claimed two aircraft on the ground at Akyab airfield, that were probably the Dakota and Hurricane claimed by Zeros ground-strafing. During the chaos caused by Operation C and the raid by Malaya Force, the Japanese were able to get a convoy of troops and equipment into Rangoon.

== Aftermath ==
=== Analysis ===
In three days, Malaya Force claimed to have sunk 21 merchant ships, sinking 20 ships and damaging three more of over 130,000 GRT in attacks by aircraft and ships. In 2017, Andrew Boyd wrote that an Admiralty study, "Future British Naval Strategy" (14 December 1941) formed part of a comprehensive review of policy for the Far East, now that Japan had joined the war. The review gave emphasis to the containment of the Japanese expansion, avoiding the loss of Singapore and other strategically valuable areas necessary for military recovery and reconquest. For six months, at least, the Indian Ocean was vital to the British and the corollary was the protection of Ceylon, whose defences were exiguous. The security of the Indian Ocean was a naval matter and a considerable effort would be necessary, with support from the United States Navy limited to the Atlantic. The review recognised that the Far East and Middle East must be seen as a whole. The Indian Ocean was perhaps, at the start of 1942, the most important theatre of operations for the British and the US after the Battle of the Atlantic and impinged on the survival of the USSR.

The Japanese did not exploit their victory as the British feared, their aircraft carriers needed maintenance and replenishment after months of operations and there was already difficulty in maintaining the strength of front line air units. Japanese commanders felt that the losses inflicted on the British did not justify the cost to Japanese aircrew. In early May, the aircraft carriers fought the Battle of the Coral Sea in the south-west Pacific, followed in June by the Battle of Midway that ended the threat of serious Japanese naval operations in the Indian Ocean. Later Japanese operations in the Indian Ocean were conducted by submarines and armed merchant cruisers, with some success. The Allies invaded Madagascar (5 May – 6 November 1942) to prevent the Japanese from establishing a base to attack shipping and Japanese submarines attacked the harbour at Diego-Suarez.

=== Casualties ===
In April, Malaya Force sank 20 ships in the Bay of Bengal and damaged another three, with 139 Merchant Navy men killed, concurrent with Operation C around Ceylon. Malaya Force suffered minor damage to two aircraft.

== Japanese order of battle ==
=== Malaya Unit Striking Force ===
Malaya Force (1–11 April 1942)
| Ship | (English) | Flag | Class | Notes |
Vice-Admiral Jisaburō Ozawa
4th Carrier Squadron
| Ryūjō | Prancing Dragon | Imperial Japanese Navy | Light aircraft carrier | |
| Mikuma | Mikuma River | Imperial Japanese Navy | Mogami-class cruiser | |
| Mogami | Mogami River | Imperial Japanese Navy | Mogami-class cruiser | |
| Suzuya | Suzuya River | Imperial Japanese Navy | Mogami-class cruiser | |
7th Cruiser Squadron
| Chōkai | Mount Chōkai | Imperial Japanese Navy | Takao-class cruiser | |
| Takao | Mount Takao | Imperial Japanese Navy | Takao-class cruiser | |
11th Destroyer Division (to 3–4 April)
| Yura | Yura River | Imperial Japanese Navy | Nagara-class cruiser | |
| Fubuki | Blizzard | Imperial Japanese Navy | Fubuki-class destroyer | |
| Shirayuki | White Snow | Imperial Japanese Navy | Fubuki-class destroyer | |
| Hatsuyuki | First Snow | Imperial Japanese Navy | Fubuki-class destroyer | |
| Murakumo | Massed Clouds | Imperial Japanese Navy | Fubuki-class destroyer | |
20th Destroyer Division (from 3–4 April)
| Amagiri | Fogged/Clouded Sky | Imperial Japanese Navy | Fubuki-class destroyer | |
| Asagiri | Morning Fog | Imperial Japanese Navy | Fubuki-class destroyer | |
| Shirakumo | White Cloud | Imperial Japanese Navy | Fubuki-class destroyer | |
| Yūgiri | Evening Mist | Imperial Japanese Navy | Fubuki-class destroyer | |

=== Patrol Force ===
Guard Unit
| Ship | (English) | Flag | Class | Notes |
Rear-Admiral Hashimoto Shintarō
| Sendai | Blizzard | Imperial Japanese Navy | Sendai-class cruiser | 11th Destroyer Division |
| Fubuki | Blizzard | Imperial Japanese Navy | Fubuki-class destroyer | 11th Destroyer Division |
| Hatsuyuki | First Snow | Imperial Japanese Navy | Fubuki-class destroyer | 11th Destroyer Division |
| Isonami | Shore Wave | Imperial Japanese Navy | Fubuki-class destroyer | 11th Destroyer Division |
| Murakumo | Massed Clouds | Imperial Japanese Navy | Fubuki-class destroyer | 11th Destroyer Division |
| Shirayuki | White Snow | Imperial Japanese Navy | Fubuki-class destroyer | 11th Destroyer Division |
| Uranami | Shore Wave | Imperial Japanese Navy | Fubuki-class destroyer | 11th Destroyer Division |

=== Transport Force ===
Hokyū Butai
| Ship | (English) | Flag | Class | Notes |
|---|---|---|---|---|
| MV Nishiei Maru | — | Imperial Japanese Navy | Tanker | |
| Ayanami | Twilled Waves | Imperial Japanese Navy | Fubuki-class destroyer | Det. 4th Carrier Division |
| Shiokaze | Sea Breeze | Imperial Japanese Navy | Minekaze-class destroyer | Det. 4th Carrier Division |

=== Malaya Force groups ===
North, Centre and South forces
| Ship | (English) | Flag | Class | Notes |
Northern Force
| Kumano | Kumano River | Imperial Japanese Navy | Mogami-class cruiser | 7th Cruiser Division |
| Suzuya | Suzuya River | Imperial Japanese Navy | Mogami-class cruiser | 7th Cruiser Division |
| Shirakumo | White Cloud | Imperial Japanese Navy | Fubuki-class destroyer | 20th Destroyer Division |
Central Force
| Ryūjō | Prancing Dragon | Imperial Japanese Navy | Light aircraft carrier | 4th Carrier Division |
| Chōkai | Mount Chōkai | Imperial Japanese Navy | Takao-class cruiser | |
| Yura | Yura River | Imperial Japanese Navy | Nagara-class cruiser | |
| Asagiri | Morning Fog | Imperial Japanese Navy | Fubuki-class destroyer | 20th Destroyer Division |
| Yūgiri | Evening Mist | Imperial Japanese Navy | Fubuki-class destroyer | 20th Destroyer Division |
Southern Force
| Mikuma | Mikuma River | Imperial Japanese Navy | Mogami-class cruiser | 7th Cruiser Division |
| Mogami | Mogami River | Imperial Japanese Navy | Mogami-class cruiser | 7th Cruiser Division |
| Amagiri | Fogged/Clouded Sky | Imperial Japanese Navy | Fubuki-class destroyer | 20th Destroyer Division |

=== Ships sunk by Malaya Force ===
Merchant ships attacked
| Name | Year | Flag | GRT | Notes |
Northern Force
| SS Autolycus | 1922 | Merchant Navy | 7,718 | 6 April 1942, gunfire, 19°40′N, 86°50′E, sunk, 18† 82 surv |
| MV Elsa | 1928 | Norway | 5,381 | 6 April 1942, gunfire, 35 nmi E. of Cuttack. sunk, 1† 29 surv |
| Exmoor | 1919 | United States | 4,986 | 6 March 1942, gunfire, sunk |
| SS Indora | 1938 | Merchant Navy | 6,622 | 6 April 1942, gunfire, Bay of Bengal, sunk, 2† 81 surv |
| SS Malda | 1922 | Merchant Navy | 9,066 | 6 April 1942, gunfire, 19°45′N, 86°27′E, sunk, 25† 154 surv |
| SS Silksworth | 1922 | Merchant Navy | 4,921 | 6 April 1942, gunfire off Puri, sunk, 0† 57 surv |
| SS Shinkuang | 1920 | Merchant Navy | 2,410 | 6 April 1942, gunfire, off Puri, 3† |
Central Force
| MV Anglo Canadian | 1928 | Merchant Navy | 5,268 | Damaged |
| MV Banjoewangi | 1939 | Netherlands | 1,279 | 6 April 1942, gunfire, sunk, 17°35′N, 83°45′E, 13† |
| MV Batavia | 1939 | Netherlands | 1,279 | Damaged |
| SS Bienville | 1921 | United States | 5,491 | 6 April 1942, carrier aircraft, 17°48′N, 84°09′W, 24† 17 surv, sank |
| SS Ganges | 1930 | Merchant Navy | 6,245 | 6 April 1942, carrier aircraft, sunk, 15† |
| SS Harpasa | 1934 | Merchant Navy | 5,082 | 5 April 1942, carrier aircraft 19°19′N, 85°46′E, 11† 33 surv, sank |
| SS Marion Moller | 1909 | Merchant Navy | 3,827 | 6 April 1942, damaged |
| SS Point Clear | 1920 | United States | 4,839 | Damaged |
| SS Selma City | 1921 | United States | 5,686 | 7 April 1942, carrier aircraft, sunk, 0† |
| SS Sinkiang | 1915 | Merchant Navy | 2,646 | 6 April 1942, carrier aircraft, 17°32′N, 82°50′E, 0† |
| SS Taksang | 1935 | Merchant Navy | 3,471 | 6 April 1942, gunfire, 17°52′N, 83°40′E, sunk, 15† 107 surv |
| MV Van der Capellen | 1942 | Netherlands | 2,073 | 8 April 1942, carrier aircraft, sunk, 0† |
Southern Force
| MV Dagfred | 1930 | Norway | 4,434 | 6 April 1942, gunfire, 16°15′N, 82°09′E, sunk, 0† 40 surv |
| SS Dardanus | 1923 | Merchant Navy | 7,726 | 6 April 1942, gunfire, carrier aircraft |
| SS Gandara | 1919 | Merchant Navy | 5,281 | 6 April 1942, gunfire, 16°03′N, 82°20′E, sunk, 13† 69 surv |
| SS Hermod | 1925 | Norway | 1,515 | 6 April 1942, gunfire, Bay of Bengal, scuttled, 0† |

== Bibliography ==
=== Books ===
- Boyd, Andrew (2017). The Royal Navy in Eastern Waters. Barnsley: Seaforth. ISBN 978-1-4738-9248-4.
- Boyd, Carl & Yoshida, Akihiko (2013). The Japanese Submarine Force and World War II. Annapolis, MD: Naval Institute Press. ISBN 978-1-5575-0015-1.
- Defensive Phase. Ministry of Defence (Navy) War with Japan. Vol. II. London: HMSO. 1995. ISBN 978-0-11-772818-9.
- Jordan, Roger W. (2006) [1999]. The World's Merchant Fleets 1939: The Particulars and Wartime Fates of 6,000 Ships (2nd ed.). London: Chatham/Lionel Leventhal. ISBN 978-1-86176-293-1.
- Parshall, Jonathan & Tully, Anthony (2005). Shattered Sword: The Untold Story of the Battle of Midway. Dulles, VA: Potomac Books. ISBN 1-57488-923-0 – via Archive Foundation.
- Perrett, Bryan (2014). Why the Japanese Lost: The red sun's Setting. Barnsley: Pen & Sword Military. ISBN 978-1-78159-198-7 – via Archive Foundation.
- Piegzik, Mikhal A. (2022a). The Darkest Hour: The Japanese Naval Offensive in the Indian Ocean 1942 – The Opening Moves. Asia@War No.31. Vol. I. Warwick: Helion. ISBN 978-1-915070-61-6.
- Piegzik, Mikhal A. (2022). The Darkest Hour: The Japanese Naval Offensive in the Indian Ocean 1942 – The Attack against Ceylon and the Eastern Fleet. Asia@War No. 33. Vol. II. Warwick: Helion. ISBN 978-1-804510-23-0.
- Rohwer, Jürgen; Hümmelchen, Gerhard (2005) [1972]. Chronology of the War at Sea, 1939–1945: The Naval History of World War Two (3rd rev. ed.). London: Chatham. ISBN 1-86176-257-7.
- Roskill, Stephen (1956). War at Sea 1939–1945: The Period of Balance. United Kingdom Military Series. Vol. II. London: HMSO. OCLC 59620954 – via Archive Foundation.
- Shores, Christopher; Cull, Brian; Izawa, Yasuho (2014) [1993]. Bloody Shambles: The Defence of Sumatra to the Fall of Burma. Vol. II. London: Grub Street. ISBN 978-0-94-881767-0 – via Archive Foundation.
- Stephenson, Charles (2022). The Eastern Fleet and the Indian Ocean 1942–1944: The Fleet that had to Hide. Barnsley and New York: Pen & Sword Books. ISBN 978-1-52679-776-6.
- Stille, Mark (2023). Japan's Indian Ocean Raid, 1942. Campaign No.396. Oxford: Osprey. ISBN 978-1-47285-418-6.
- Warner, Oliver; Bennett, Geoffrey; Macyntire, Donald G. F. W.; Uehling, Franck; Wettern, Desmond; Preston, Antony; Mordal, Jacques (1976). Histoire de la guerre sur mer: des premiers cuirassés aux sous-marins nucléaires [History of Naval Warfare: From the first Battleships to Nuclear Submarines]. Encyclopédie visuelle Elsevier (in French) (French trans. from Eng ed.). Paris Bruxelles: Elsevier Séquoia. ISBN 978-2-8003-0148-8.

=== Websites ===
- Allen, Tony (6 April 2017). "MV Banjoewangi". wrecksite.eu.
