= HMAS Manoora (F48) =

Australian ship in World War II

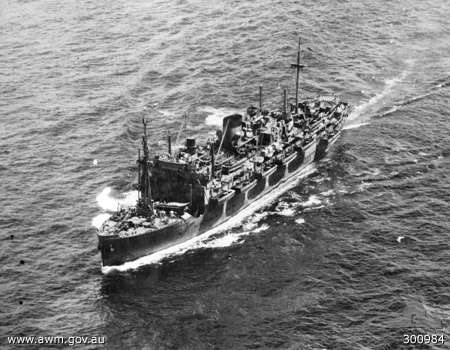
- HMAS Manoora as a Landing Ship, Infantry

History
- Name: Manoora (1935–61); Ambulombo (1961–65, 1966); Affan Oceana (1965)
- Owner: Adelaide Steamship Company, Melbourne (1935–61); Government of Indonesia (1961–65); P T Affan Raja, Indonesia (1965–66); P T P P Arafat, Indonesia (1966–72)
- Port of registry: (United Kingdom) Melbourne (1935–61); (Indonesia) Jakarta (1961–72)
- Builder: Alexander Stephen and Sons, Govan
- Yard number: 540
- Laid down: July 1934
- Launched: 25 October 1935
- Identification: UK official number: 153959; call sign: VLDL; Pennant number: F48 (C77 from 1943)
- Fate: Sold for scrap in 1972

History

Australia
- Name: Manoora
- Acquired: 11 October 1939
- Commissioned: 12 December 1939
- Decommissioned: 6 December 1947
- Out of service: 1972
- Reclassified: 2 February 1943 (from AMC to LSI)
- Motto: "In War and Peace"
- Honours and awards: Battle honours: Indian Ocean 1941–42; Pacific 1942–45; New Guinea 1944; Leyte Gulf 1944; Lingayen Gulf 1945; Borneo 1945
- Fate: Returned to owners in 1949

General characteristics
- Tonnage: 10,856 GRT, 6,261 NRT
- Length: 463.5 ft (141.3 m)
- Beam: 66.2 ft (20.2 m)
- Draught: 35 ft 6 in (10.8 m)
- Depth: 29.8 ft (9.1 m)
- Decks: 3
- Installed power: 8,200 brake horsepower (6,100 kW), 1,306 NHP
- Propulsion: 2 × diesels by JG Kincaid, Greenock; 2 × screws
- Speed: 15.7 knots (29.1 km/h)
- Capacity: 1,230 troops (as LSI)
- Complement: 345
- Armament: As AMC: 7 × 6-inch guns; 2 × 3-inch anti-aircraft guns; 2 × Lewis light machine guns; As LSI: 1 × 6-inch gun (later replaced by 2 × 4-inch guns); 2 × 3-inch anti-aircraft guns; 8 × 20mm Oerlikon anti-aircraft guns; 6 × 40mm Bofors anti-aircraft guns (added later)
- Aircraft carried: 1 × Seagull V aircraft (as AMC)

HMAS Manoora was an ocean liner that served in the Royal Australian Navy (RAN) during World War II. She was built in Scotland in 1935 for the Cairns to Fremantle coastal passenger run for the Adelaide Steamship Company. She was requisitioned by the RAN for naval service in 1939. Manoora was initially converted into an armed merchant cruiser (AMC), operating primarily in Australian, New Guinea, and Pacific waters, with deployments to Singapore and the Bay of Bengal.

In 1942, the ship was converted into the RAN's first landing ship, infantry (LSI). After extensive training, Manoora was involved in most of the Allied amphibious operations in the Pacific during 1944 and 1945. After the war's end, the ship was used to transport occupation forces and refugees until 1947, when she was decommissioned from naval service and returned to the Adelaide Steamship Company. Manoora continued to operate in Australian waters until 1961, when she was sold to an Indonesian company and renamed Albulombo. The ship was sold for scrap in 1972.

== Design and construction ==
The passenger liner was 482 feet (147 m) in length overall, with a beam of 66 feet 3 inches (20.19 m), and a draught of 24 feet (7.3 m). Manoora's tonnages were 10,856 GRT and 6,261 NRT. She had twin screws, each powered by an eight-cylinder four-stroke diesel engine. Between them the two engines were rated at 8,200 brake horsepower (6,100 kW) and gave the ship a speed of 16.5 knots (30.6 km/h).

Manoora was built by Alexander Stephen and Sons in Govan, Scotland for the Adelaide Steamship Company. The ship was laid down in July 1934, launched on 25 October 1935, and completed in 1935.

It was a company policy for all its motor vessels to have a name starting with "M" and the liner was named after the town of Manoora in South Australia. It was the sister ship of the Mununda.

The ship was launched by Lady Hore Ruthven (wife of the Governor of New South Wales).

== Operational history ==
=== 1935 Passenger service ===
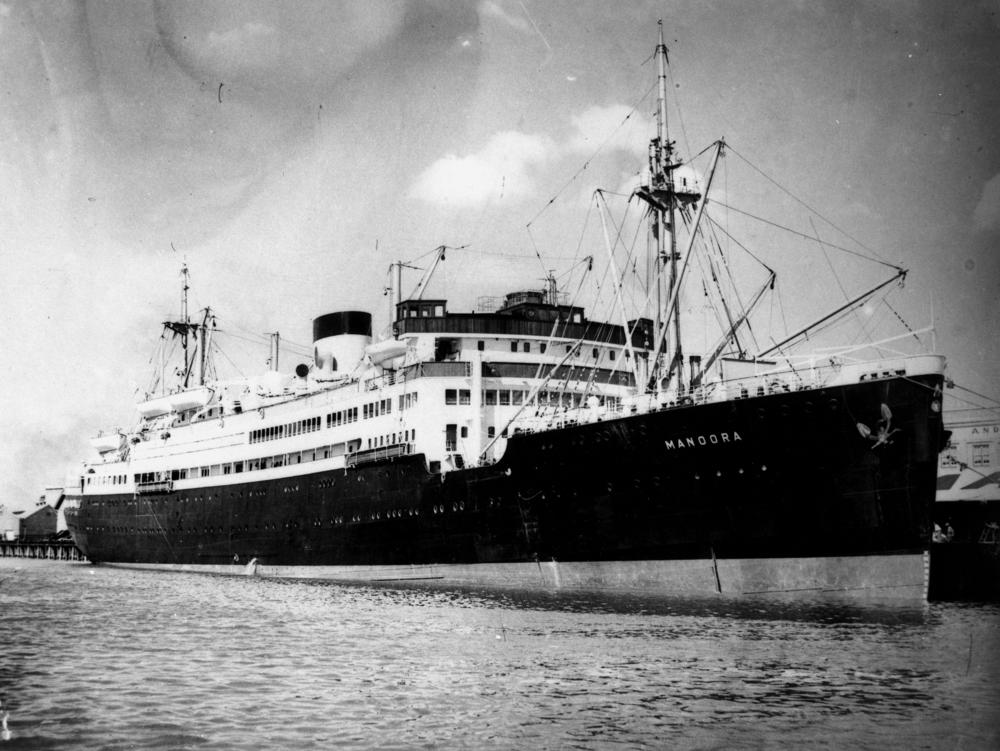
Manoora in the Brisbane River in 1936

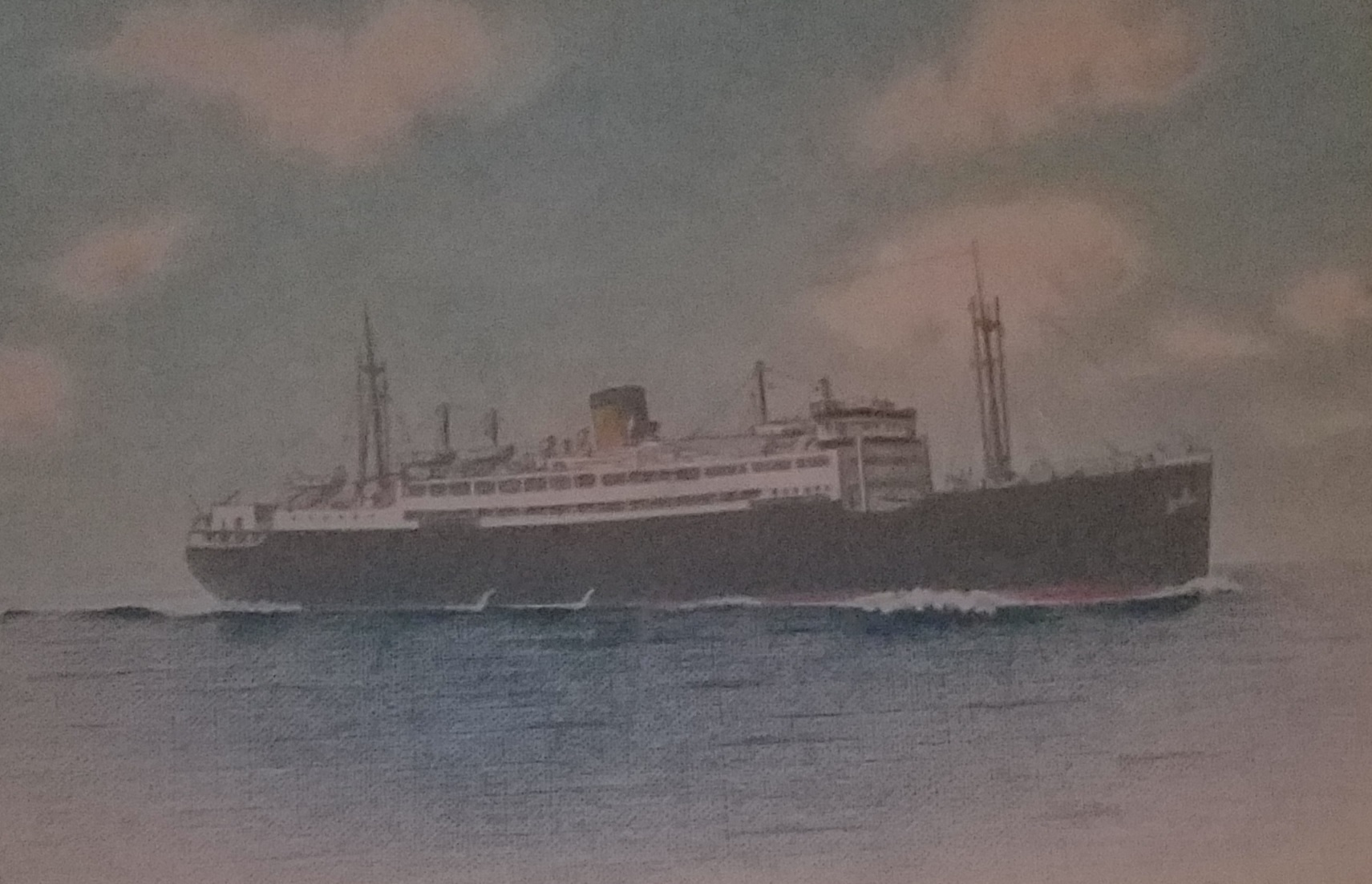
MV MANOORA 6 June 1937

Manoora showcased the latest in streamlined design. The ship left Scotland on 13 February 1935 and, travelling via Fremantle, arrived in Brisbane on 13 June en route from Melbourne to Cairns. The ship made several visits to North Queensland. Manoora subsequently entered service on the Cairns to Fremantle coastal passenger run.

=== 1939 Armed merchant cruiser ===
On 14 November 1939, the liner was requisitioned by the RAN for use as an armed merchant cruiser (AMC). The AMC conversion consisted of the addition of seven 6-inch main guns, two 3-inch anti-aircraft guns, and equipment to operate a Supermarine Walrus amphibious aircraft. Manoora was commissioned into the RAN on 12 December 1939, although the conversion was not completed until 5 February 1940. She was assigned the pennant number F48.

Initially, the ship was used to patrol Australian waters, but during March 1940, she was redeployed to the China Station to operate with the Malaya Force. During the ship's return to Australia in early April, Manoora intercepted four Norwegian merchant vessels and escorted them to Brisbane; Norway having recently fallen to the Germans, and the Allies wanted to ensure as many Norwegian-flagged vessel came under their control as possible. On 12 June, shortly after Italy became involved in the war, Manoora intercepted the Italian passenger vessel Romolo, which was scuttled off the Solomon Islands. The AMC then provided assistance to United States cargo ship Admiral Wiley, which had run aground at Kitava.

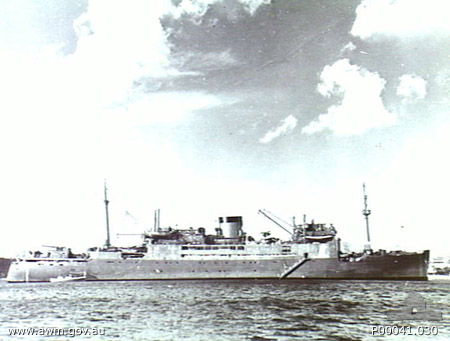
HMAS Manoora in 1942, carrying a Seagull V aircraft ahead of her funnel

Between the end of 1940 and September 1941, Manoora's operated around the north and east coasts of Australia, around New Guinea and New Britain, and to the Solomons, Nauru, and Ocean Island. In December, the AMC transported Admiral Sir Guy Royle to Singapore, then transited to the Bay of Bengal for escort duties. On 1 March 1942, the ship left Colombo for Australia, with a convoy of troopships returning from the Middle East.

=== 1942 Landing ship ===
In mid-1942, Manoora was marked for conversion into the RAN's first landing ship, infantry (LSI) at Garden Island Dockyard. Her AMC armament was removed and replaced with a single 12-pounder gun, six 40 mm Bofors, and eight 20 mm Oerlikons. The Walrus amphibian was removed, and the ship was modified to carry landing craft: 17 LCVPs, and two LCMs. Manoora was initially able to carry 850 soldiers, but later modifications increased this to 1,250. The ship was recommissioned on 2 February 1943 with the pennant number C77, and after spending six months on amphibious warfare training in Port Phillip, was deployed to New Guinea.

After further training and exercises near Milne Bay, Manoora participated in her first amphibious landing on 22 April 1944; the Operation Reckless landings at Tanamerah Bay. Following Operation Reckless, the LSI saw service in most of the amphibious operations in the Pacific theatre. On 17 May, Manoora operated as part of the Battle of Wakde, followed by the landings at Morotai on 15 September, and Leyte during October. At the start of 1945, the ship participated in operations at Lingayen Gulf, followed by the Borneo campaign, with landings at Tarakan on 1 May, Brunei Bay during 9 and 10 June, then Balikpapan on 1 July. After this, Manoora sailed to Australia, and was in Sydney when World War II ended.

=== 1947 Post war resettling transport ===
After the war's end, Manoora was used to transport the soldiers and equipment of occupation forces, and return evacuees from the East Indies region to their homes. The LSI's naval service ended on 6 December 1947, when she was decommissioned from naval service. She received six battle honours for her wartime service: "Indian Ocean 1941–42", "Pacific 1942–45", "New Guinea 1944", "Leyte Gulf 1944", "Lingayen Gulf 1945", and "Borneo 1945".

In 1947, Minister for Immigration Arthur Calwell requested the use of Manoora to help Australian and British citizens escape the increasing unrest in India preceding the nation's independence and resettle them in Australia. Plans were made for multiple voyages from India to Australia, although only one sailing eventuated, arriving back in Fremantle on 15 August: austere accommodations on the barrack decks prompted many potential passengers to instead wait for commercial vessels. Although Calwell, a strong supporter of the White Australia Policy insisted on passengers being "Australian/English by birth... of full European descent", most of the 736 passengers were Anglo-Indians.

=== 1949 Return to passenger service ===
After two years of maintenance and refit at Cockatoo Island Dockyard to remove the wartime modifications, Manoora was returned to the Adelaide Steamship Company on 31 August 1949 The ship again conducted winter tours between Melbourne and Cairns.

=== 1969 Sale to Indonesia ===
In August 1969, the ship was sold to an Indonesian company, who renamed her Albulombo.

=== 1972 Sinking ===
The ship was sold for scrap to a Japanese firm in October 1972, to be broken up in Taiwan. However, it sunk at 18.19°N 120.34°E while under tow from Djakarta to Kaohsiung for breaking.

== Legacy ==
The suburb of Manoora, Queensland in Cairns is named after the ship. The neighbouring suburb of Manunda is named after Manoora's sister ship Manunda.

== See also ==
- HMAS_Kanimbla_(C78)
