= SS Malda =

SS Malda is the name of the following ships:

- SS Malda (1913), sunk by SM U-70 on 25 August 1917
- SS Malda (1922), sunk by Japanese warships on 6 April 1942

== See also ==
- Malda (disambiguation)
