= Greek ship Ierax =

At least two ships of the Hellenic Navy have borne the name Ierax (Greek: Ιέραξ, "hawk"):

- Greek destroyer Ierax (1912) an Aetos-class destroyer acquired in 1912 and decommissioned in 1946.
- Greek destroyer Ierax (D31) a Cannon-class destroyer escort launched in 1944 as USS Ebert she was transferred to Greece in 1951 and renamed. She was sunk as a target in 2002.
