= Greek destroyer Leon (1912) =

Aetos-class destroyer (1921-1941)

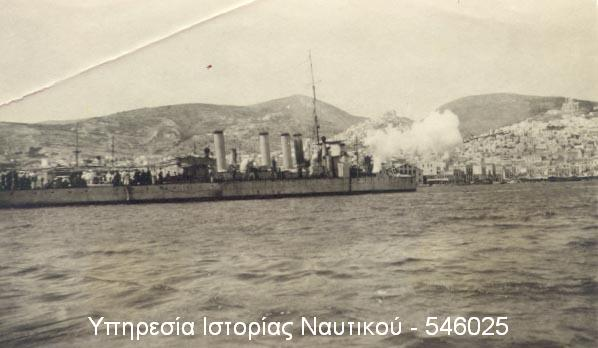
- Destroyer Leon

History

Greece
- Name: Leon (ΒΠ Λέων)
- Namesake: lion
- Ordered: 1912
- Builder: Cammell Laird, Birkenhead
- Laid down: 1911
- Launched: 1 July 1911
- Commissioned: 1912
- Decommissioned: 15 May 1941
- Fate: Sunk at Souda Bay, Crete 1941

General characteristics
- Class & type: Aetos-class destroyer
- Displacement: 880 tons standard
- Length: 89.4 m (293 ft)
- Beam: 8.3 m (27 ft)
- Draft: 3 m (9.8 ft)
- Propulsion: 5 × Foster Wheeler boilers (4 coal-fired and 1 oil-fired), replaced by Yarrow oil-fired boilers in 1925; 5 funnels; combined Parsons and Curtis steam turbines
- Speed: 31 knots (57 km/h) maximum (32 knots (59 km/h) after 1925)
- Complement: 58
- Armament: As completed: 4 × 4 in (100 mm)/50 guns; 1 × 3 in (76 mm) anti-aircraft gun; 6 × 21-inch (533 mm) torpedo tubes; 3 × electric search lights; 1925: 76.2 mm gun removed; 37 mm anti-aircraft gun added; four-barrel 40 mm (1.6 in) gun added; 2 mortars added; Modified for laying 40 mines; 1942: 3rd and 4th stern torpedo launchers removed; 1 × 3-inch (76 mm) anti-aircraft gun added; 1 × 20 mm Oerlikon gun added; A/S type 123A detection device added

Leon (Greek: ΒΠ Λέων, "Lion") was an Aetos-class destroyer which served in the Royal Hellenic Navy from 1912–1941.

== Origin ==
The ship, along with her three sister ships Ierax, Panthir, and Aetos, had originally been ordered by Argentina from English shipyard Cammell Laird in Birkenhead. Leon was originally named Tucumán. They were purchased in 1912 by Greece, ready for delivery, each for the sum of £148,000, when the Balkan Wars seemed likely.

== Service history ==
During the Balkan Wars, the Royal Hellenic Navy purchased only the minimum amount of ammunition, 3,000 rounds. Torpedoes were not available for this class of ship, so these ships were initially named "scouts" rather than "destroyers". Leon was in action during the Balkan Wars under Lieutenant Commander J. Razikotsikas; also on board was Squadron Commander Lieutenant Commander D. Papachristos.

During World War I, Greece belatedly entered the war on the side of the Triple Entente, and due to Greece's neutrality, the four Aetos-class ships were seized by the Allies in October 1916, taken over by the French in November, and served in the French Navy from 1917-18. By 1918, they were back on escort duty under Greek colors and were in action blockading the coasts of the Black Sea from Bosphorus north to Trebizond.

On 22 December 1921, while moored with Ierax in Piraeus Harbour, they were both severely damaged by the explosion of a depth charge, which the crew of Leon was transporting. Two officers, one petty officer, and two sailors were killed on Leon, as were two sailors on Ierax. Leon completely lost her aft section up to her stern gun.

After the war, Leon was refurbished from 1925–1927. She also participated in the Second World War. On 18 April 1941, during a convoy escort, she collided with the passenger ship Ardena followed by the explosion of two depth charges. As a result, her stern section was cut off and two officers were killed. She was finally sunk by German bombers on 15 May 1941, in Souda Bay (Crete). where she had been towed from Salamis Naval Base.

== See also ==
- History of the Hellenic Navy
