= Hierax (Platonist) =

2nd century Platonist philosopher

Hierax (Ancient Greek: Ἱέραξ) was a Middle Platonist philosopher who flourished in approximately the 2nd century CE whose work On Justice (Ancient Greek: Περὶ δικαιοσύνης) survives in eight separate excerpts made by Stobaeus. The surviving quotes focus on the ill effects that an unjust person brings upon themselves, and attack the views of justice of the Stoic and Peripatetic schools.

== Life ==
Nothing is known about Hierax's life. The proximity of Hierax's way of thinking to that of Middle Platonists such as Alcinous, Apuleius and Maximus of Tyre is the only indication for the dating, which prompted Karl Praechter to see Hierax as a contemporary of these thinkers and therefore to place him in the 2nd century. Following a common practice of his time, Hierax supplemented Platonism with ideas from other schools of philosophy - the Stoic and Peripatetic. In this respect he was an eclectic. On the other hand, he also criticized the ideas of justice held by representatives of these two schools.

== On Justice ==
Hierax's work On Justice appears to be a presentation of the material that emerged from the author's oral teaching activities.

In his discussion of the question of how justice is to be defined, Hierax rejects both the understanding of justice of the "many" (non-philosophers) and definitions coming from Peripatetics and Stoics. He criticizes the popular definitions for not excluding behavior that he believes is incompatible with justice. Justice should not be limited to a correct attitude to property issues. It does not consist of "equality" (isótēs); in fact, this is extremely unjust. Hierax sees justice as a virtue of the soul and thus a state of the soul and not its consequence, the external manifestation of the soul's quality through actions. He thus rejects the Aristotelian conception of justice, which is based on social behavior, and opposes it to the Platonic one. For him, justice as a virtue is a fruit of reason (phrónēsis). Therefore, it can necessarily only occur in conjunction with the other virtues, since reason, if it exists, necessarily gives rise to all the virtues. Hierax sees justice as an overall virtue, which is expressed in the striving for the right order within the soul or in the presence of this order. As a superior virtue, it presupposes the other virtues; this is evident from the fact that it is incompatible with the vices opposed to it.

In interpreting the Socratic-Platonic doctrine that the one who commits an injustice is more harmed by it than the one who suffers it, Hierax puts forward several considerations. One of them presupposes the radical assumption that physical and external goods are irrelevant and therefore only damage to the soul with regard to its virtue can be viewed as a real loss; However, since only the perpetrator and not the victim suffers such a loss as a result of the crime, he only harms himself with his crime.
