= Greek ship Niki =

At least three ships of the Hellenic Navy have borne the name Niki (Greek: Νίκη, "Victory"):

- Greek destroyer Niki (1906), a Niki-class destroyer launched in 1906 and stricken in 1945.
- Greek destroyer Niki (D63), a Gleaves-class destroyer launched in 1942 as USS Eberle she was transferred to Greece in 1951 and renamed. She was scrapped in 1972.
- Greek gunboat Niki (P62), a Thetis-class gunboat commissioned in the German Navy in 1961 as Thetis she was transferred to Greece in 1991 and renamed. She was decommissioned in 2009.
