= Malda =

Malda may refer to:

- Malda district in West Bengal state, northeastern India
- Malda division, an administrative unit that includes Malda district
- Malda, West Bengal, city in Malda district in West Bengal state, eastern India
  - Maldah (Vidhan Sabha constituency), state assembly constituency
  - Malda (Lok Sabha constituency), former constituency of the Indian parliament in West Bengal
- Latin Catholic Apostolic Prefecture of Malda (former; renamed and promoted as Diocese of Dumka)
- Malda, Bihar, a village in West Champaran district in Bihar state, northeastern India
- Malda, Estonia, a village
- Maldà in Catalonia, Spain

Malda is also a given name. People with the name include:

- Malda Baumgartė (born 1965), Latvian-born Lithuanian retired paralympic athlete
- Malda Susuri (born 1988), Kosovo Albanian singer, visual artist and graphic designer
