= Greek destroyer Panthir (1912) =

History

Greece
- Name: Panthir (ΒΠ Πάνθηρ)
- Namesake: Panther
- Ordered: 1912
- Builder: Cammell Laird, Birkenhead
- Laid down: 1911
- Launched: 1 April 1911
- Commissioned: 1912
- Decommissioned: 1946
- Fate: Broken up

General characteristics
- Class & type: Aetos-class destroyer
- Displacement: 880 tons standard
- Length: 89.4 m (293 ft)
- Beam: 8.3 m (27 ft)
- Draft: 3 m (9.8 ft)
- Propulsion: 5 × Foster Wheeler boilers (4 coal-fired and 1 oil-fired), replaced by Yarrow oil-fired boilers in 1925; 5 funnels; combined Parsons and Curtis steam turbines
- Speed: 31 knots (57 km/h) maximum (32 knots (59 km/h) after 1925)
- Complement: 58
- Armament: As completed: 4 × 4 in (100 mm)/50 guns; 1 × 3 in (76 mm) anti-aircraft gun; 6 × 21-inch (533 mm) torpedo tubes; 3 × electric search lights; 1925: 76.2 mm gun removed; 37 mm anti-aircraft gun added; four-barrel 40 mm (1.6 in) gun added; 2 mortars added; Modified for laying 40 mines; 1942: 3rd and 4th stern torpedo launchers removed; 1 × 3-inch (76 mm) anti-aircraft gun added; 1 × 20 mm Oerlikon gun added; A/S type 123A detection device added

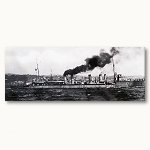
Panthir

Panthir (Greek: ΒΠ Πάνθηρ, "Panther") was an Aetos-class destroyer which served in the Hellenic Royal Navy from 1912 to 1946.

== Origin ==
The ship, along with her three sister ships Ierax, Leon, and Aetos, had originally been ordered by Argentina from English shipyard Cammell Laird in Birkenhead. Panthir was originally named Santiago del Estero. They were purchased in 1912 by Greece, ready for delivery, each for the sum of £148,000, when the Balkan Wars seemed likely. Accepted by Captain Ath. Miaoulis, RHN in Palermo, Sicily, she had arrived manned by a foreign crew.

== Service history ==
During the Balkan Wars, the Royal Hellenic Navy purchased only the minimum amount of ammunition, 3,000 rounds. Torpedoes were not available for this class of ship, so these ships were initially named "scouts" rather than "destroyers".

During World War I, Greece belatedly entered the war on the side of the Triple Entente, and due to Greece's neutrality, the four Aetos-class ships were seized by the Allies in October 1916, taken over by the French in November, and served in the French Navy from 1917 to 1918. By 1918, they were back on escort duty under Greek colors, mainly in the Aegean Sea.

In 1919–1920, she participated in the operations in Southern Russia, evacuating Greek refugees from the Russian Civil War with the battleships Kilkis and Lemnos and the destroyer Leon, remaining for 263 days in the Black Sea. During the Greco-Turkish war, she took part in the blockade of the Anatolian coasts.

After the war, Panthir was refurbished from 1925 to 1927. She also participated in the Second World War, after surviving the German invasion of April, 1941, Panthir was based in the Indian Ocean. Between May and October, 1942, her armament was updated in Bombay, enabling her to offer better antiaircraft protection and antisurface capabilities on her new missions.

After the end of World War II, Panthir was stricken in 1946.

== See also ==
- History of the Hellenic Navy
