= Greek destroyer Ierax (1912) =

Greek Military Vessel

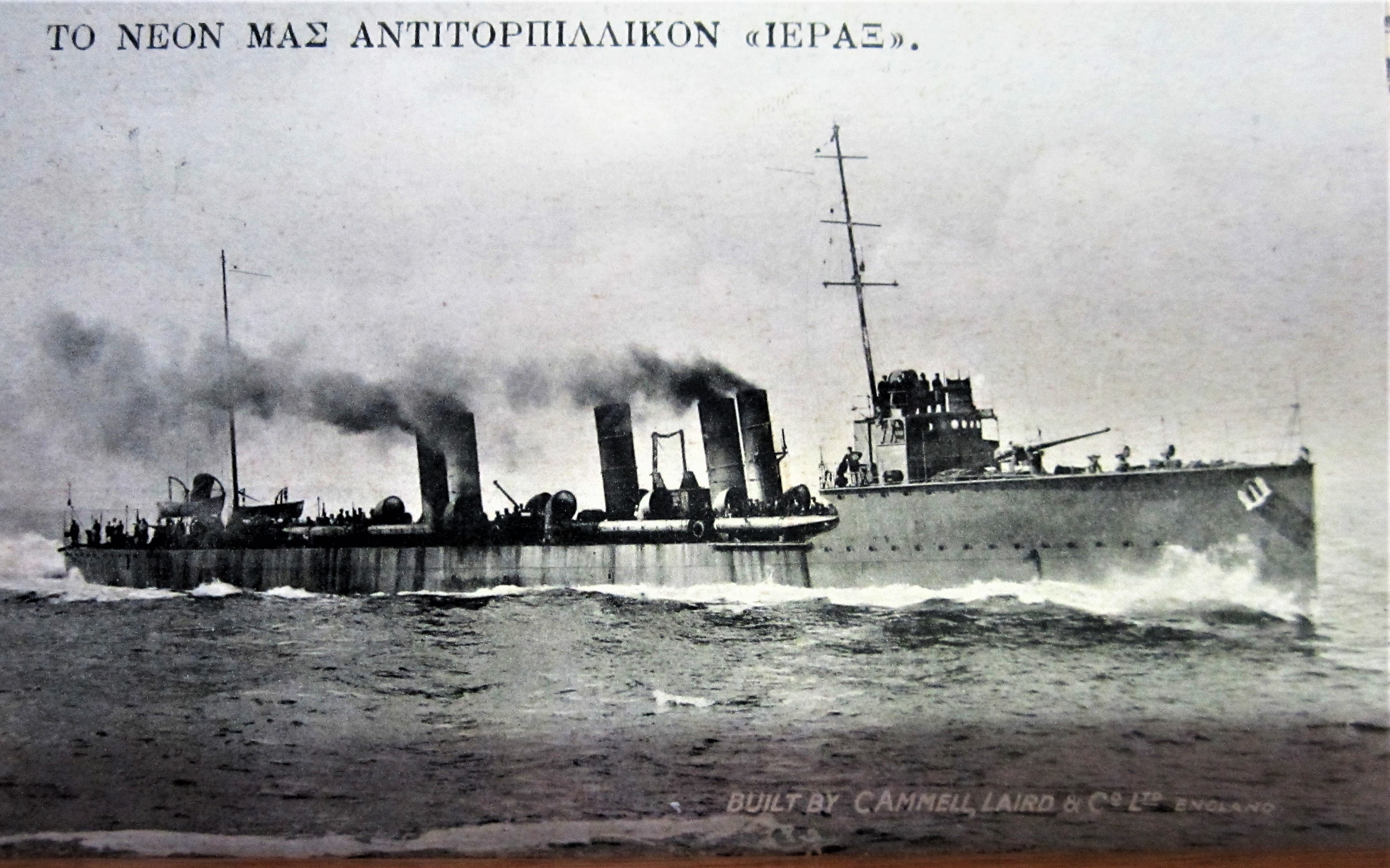
- Destroyer Ierax

History

Greece
- Name: Ierax (ΒΠ Ιέραξ)
- Namesake: hawk
- Ordered: 1912
- Builder: Cammell Laird, Birkenhead
- Laid down: 1911
- Launched: 15 March 1911
- Commissioned: 1912
- Decommissioned: 1946
- Fate: Broken up

General characteristics
- Class & type: Aetos-class destroyer
- Displacement: 880 tons standard
- Length: 89.4 m (293 ft)
- Beam: 8.3 m (27 ft)
- Draft: 3 m (9.8 ft)
- Propulsion: 5 × Foster Wheeler boilers (4 coal-fired and 1 oil-fired), replaced by Yarrow oil-fired boilers in 1925; 5 funnels; combined Parsons and Curtis steam turbines
- Speed: 31 knots (57 km/h) maximum (32 knots (59 km/h) after 1925)
- Complement: 58
- Armament: As completed: 4 × 4 in (100 mm)/50 guns; 1 × 3 in (76 mm) anti-aircraft gun; 6 × 21-inch (533 mm) torpedo tubes; 3 × electric search lights; 1925: 76.2 mm gun removed; 37 mm anti-aircraft gun added; four-barrel 40 mm (1.6 in) gun added; 2 mortars added; 1942: 3rd and 4th stern torpedo launchers removed; 1 × 3-inch (76 mm) anti-aircraft gun added; 1 × 20 mm Oerlikon gun added; A/S type 123A detection device added

Ierax (Greek: ΒΠ Ιέραξ, "Hawk") was an Aetos-class destroyer which had been built for Argentina as Santa Fe. She served in the Hellenic Royal Navy from 1912 to 1946.

== Construction as ARA Santa Fe ==
Four sister ships, Aetos, Ierax, Panthir, and Leon, had originally been ordered as the San Luis class by Argentina from English shipyard Cammell Laird in Birkenhead. The second was completed as Santa Fe. They were purchased in 1912 by Greece, ready for delivery, each for the sum of £148,000, when the Balkan Wars seemed likely. Ierax was accepted by Captain Ath. Miaoulis, RHN in Palermo, Sicily, where she arrived crewed by foreign sailors.

== Service history ==
During the Balkan Wars, the Royal Hellenic Navy purchased only the minimum amount of ammunition, 3,000 rounds. Torpedoes were not available for this class of ship, so these ships were initially named "scouts" rather than "destroyers". On 21 October 1912, under the command of Commander A. Vratsanos, RHN, Ierax was part of the Greek flotilla that captured the island of Psara from the Ottomans.

During World War I, Greece belatedly entered the war on the side of the Triple Entente, and due to Greece's neutrality, the four Aetos-class ships were seized by the Allies in October 1916, taken over by the French in November, and served in the French Navy from 1917-18. By 1918, they were back on escort duty under Greek colors, mainly in the Aegean Sea.

Ierax participated in the evacuation of Greeks from Russia during the Russian Civil War in 1918 and saw action in the Greco-Turkish War (1919-1922) in the Sea of Marmara and the Aegean Sea.

After the war, Ierax was refurbished from 1925–1927. She also participated in the Second World War; after surviving the German invasion of April 1941, Ierax was based in Alexandria, Egypt. In April 1944, a wave of mutiny swept through some of the Hellenic Royal Navy, with seamen agitating in favor of the pro-Communist guerrillas, ELAS, who were fighting a campaign in Greece against the occupying Nazis. Ierax was one of the ships whose crew mutinied and the mutiny was put down in the early morning hours of 22 April 1944.

After the end of World War II, Ierax was stricken (decommissioned) in 1946.

== See also ==
- History of the Hellenic Navy
