= EOC 4-inch 50 caliber =

British WWI-era naval gun

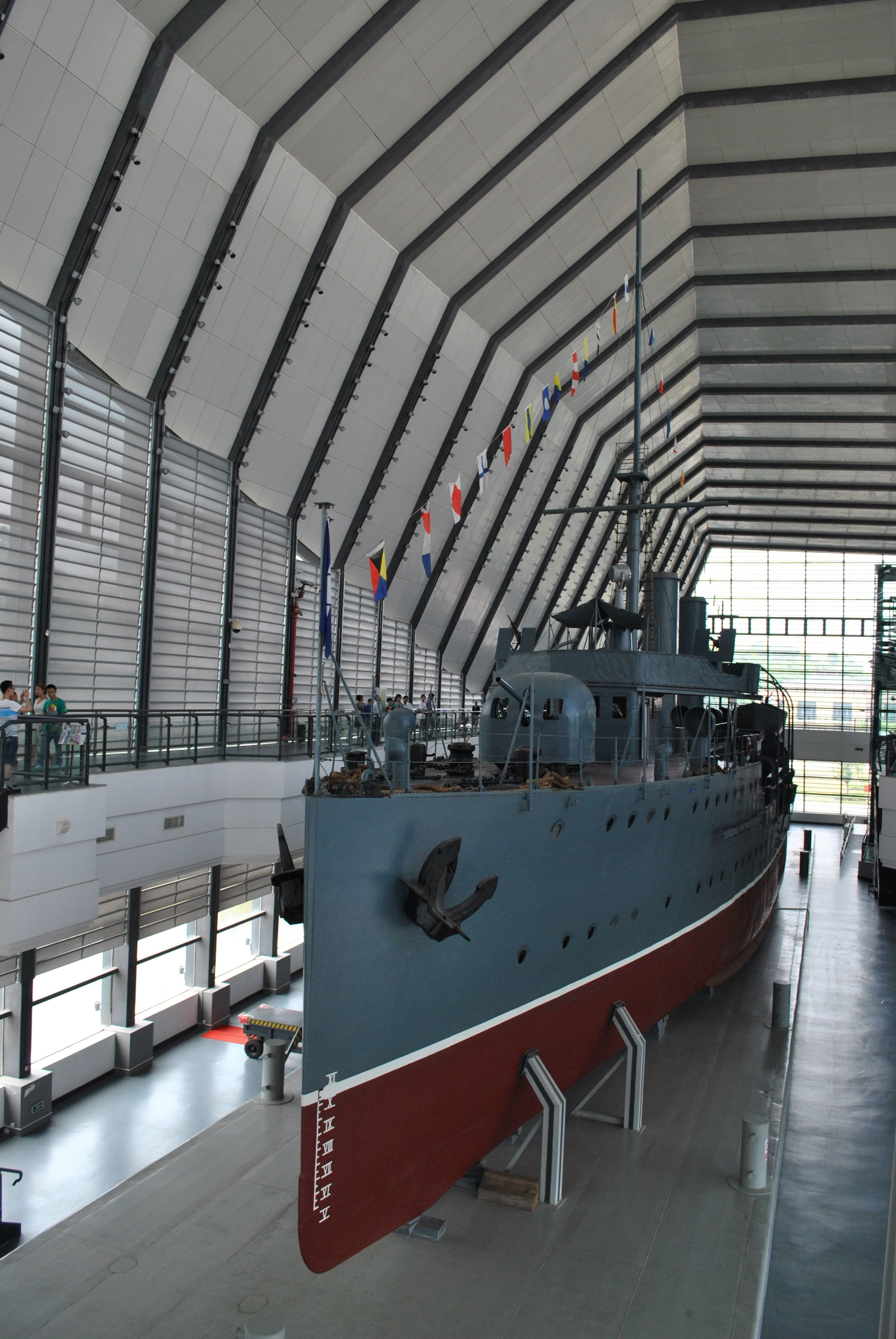
- Type: Naval gun
- Place of origin: Great Britain

Service history
- Used by: Republic of China; Greece
- Wars: Balkan Wars; World War I Greco-Turkish War; World War II

Production history
- Designer: Elswick Ordnance Company
- Designed: 1911
- Manufacturer: Armstrong Whitworth
- Produced: 1911

Specifications
- Mass: 4,816 lb (2,185 kg)
- Barrel length: 16.7 ft (5.1 m) 50 caliber
- Shell: Fixed QF ammunition 57.7 lb (26.2 kg)
- Shell weight: 31 lb (14 kg)
- Calibre: 4 inches (100 mm)
- Breech: Horizontal sliding wedge breech
- Rate of fire: 10-12 rpm
- Muzzle velocity: 3,000 ft/s (910 m/s)

The EOC 4-inch 50 caliber was a British naval gun designed by the Elswick Ordnance Company for export customers in the years before World War I that armed warships of the Republic of China and the Greek Navy. These ships served in both World War I and later World War II.

== History ==
The EOC 4-inch 50 caliber began life as a design produced by the parent company of Elswick, Armstrong Whitworth for export customers called the Pattern P. These guns did not serve aboard ships of the Royal Navy.

== Construction ==
The EOC 4-inch 50 caliber was constructed of an A tube and wire wound with a protective outer jacket. It also had a horizontal sliding-wedge breech and fired fixed quick fire ammunition.

== Naval use ==
EOC 4-inch 50 caliber guns armed coastal defense ships, destroyers and protected cruisers.

=== Coastal defense ships ===
- Yongfeng class - Two of the four ships of this class Yongjian and Yongji were armed with a single bow mounted EOC 4-inch gun. While Yongfeng and Yongxiang were similar in configuration they carried a single bow mounted Krupp 10.5 cm SK L/40 gun instead.

=== Destroyers ===
- Aetos class - The four ships of this class had a primary armament of four EOC 4-inch guns. One was bow mounted, one was amidships and two were at the stern.

=== Protected cruisers ===
- Chao Ho class - Two ships of this class Chao Ho and Ying Swei had a secondary armament of four shielded EOC 4-inch guns on sponsons amidships. The third ship of the class named Elli was sold to Greece before completion and had a different armament scheme.
