= Aetos-class destroyer =

1912 class of Greek destroyers

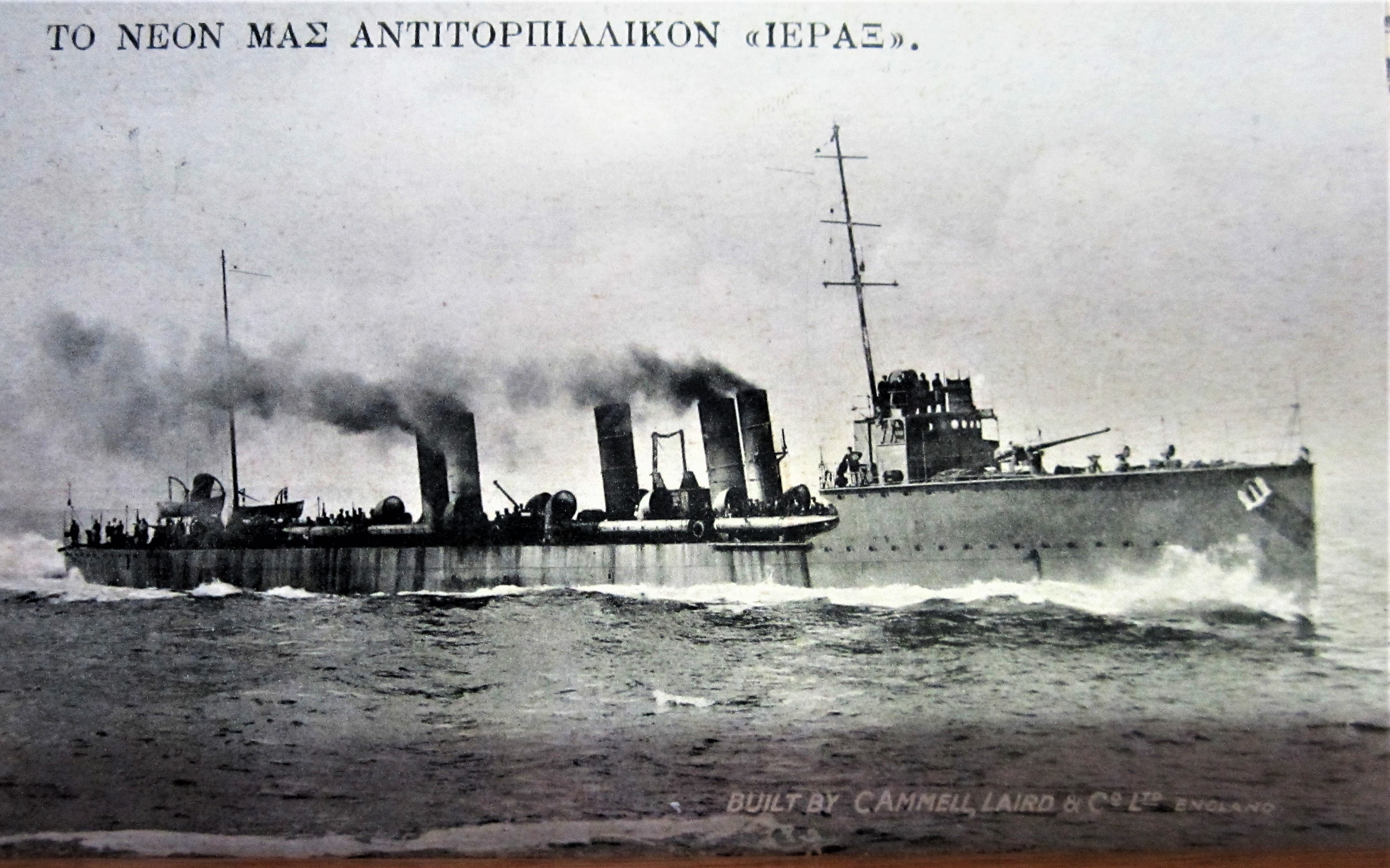
- Ierax in 1912

Class overview
- Name: Aetos
- Builders: Cammell Laird, Birkenhead
- Operators: Argentine Navy; (Greece) Royal Hellenic Navy; French Navy
- In commission: 1912
- Completed: 4
- Lost: 1
- Retired: 3

General characteristics as built
- Type: Destroyer
- Displacement: 980 long tons (1,000 t) (standard); 1,175 long tons (1,194 t) (full load)
- Length: 89.3 m (293 ft 0 in) oa; 86.9 m (285 ft 1 in) wl
- Beam: 8.4 m (27 ft 7 in)
- Draught: 2.6 m (8 ft 6 in)
- Installed power: 5 × coal-fired White-Forster boilers
- Propulsion: 2 × Parsons geared turbines; 2 shafts; 22,000 shp (16,405 kW)
- Speed: 32 knots (59 km/h)
- Complement: 90
- Armament: 4 × single 4 in (102 mm)/50 guns; 4 × single 21 in (533 mm) torpedo tubes

The Aetos class were four destroyers were originally constructed for the Argentine Navy as the San Luis class. In Greek they are known as the Thiria (Greek: Θηρία, "Wild Beasts") class, after the ships' names. They were purchased by the Royal Hellenic Navy in October 1912 when the Greek government expanded its navy after losing the Greco-Turkish War of 1897 and in anticipation of the Balkan Wars. In December 1916, during World War I, three of the destroyers were seized by France and served in the French Navy until 1918, all except Panthir. They were returned to Greece in 1918. In 1924–1925, they were extensively rebuilt and continued in service into World War II, where they fought with the Allies. Leon was sunk by German aircraft at Suda Bay, Crete. The other three destroyers survived the war and were used as station ships during the Greek Civil War. They were discarded in 1946.

== Design ==
Aetos class (as completed)

The Aetos class was 89.3 metres (293 ft 0 in) long overall and 86.9 metres (285 ft 1 in) at the waterline with a beam of 8.4 metres (27 ft 7 in) as built. The destroyers had a draught of 2.6 metres (8 ft 6 in), a standard displacement of 980 long tons (1,000 t) and a fully loaded displacement of 1,175 long tons (1,194 t). The Aetos class was powered by two Parsons geared turbines turning two shafts and fed steam by five coal-fired White-Forster boilers. The engines were rated at 22,000 shaft horsepower (16,405 kW) and had a designed speed of 32 knots (59 km/h). They carried 230 long tons (230 t) of coal. The destroyers were initially armed with four single-mounted 4-inch (102 mm) guns and four single-mounted 21-inch (533 mm) torpedo tubes. They had an initial complement of 90.

=== Modifications ===
Significant changes were made between 1924 and 1935, when the ships were reconstructed by J. Samuel White. Four Yarrow oil-fired boilers replaced the coal-fired ones, allowing the number of funnels to be reduced from five to two. One 4-inch gun was moved to a new shelter deck forward of the bridge, allowing four single torpedo tube mountings to be replaced by two triple mountings, which were turnable; two 2-pounder anti-aircraft (AA) guns were also added. Two ships were further modified in to carry 40 naval mines. (Note: The sources are in disagreement over the AA armament. Gardiner & Gray claim it was two 40 mm Bofors mounts that were installed in 1925, while Chesneau states it was two 2-pounder guns. Chesneau and Whitley states that it was Aetos and Panthir which were modified for minelaying capabilities, while Gardiner & Gray state it was Ierax and Panthir.) The displacement of the destroyers increased to 1,050 long tons (1,067 t) standard and 1,300 long tons (1,321 t) fully loaded, while their maximum speed increased to 34 knots (63 km/h).

The three surviving members of the class, Ierax, Panthir and Aetos underwent further modifications. The aft bank of torpedo tubes was replaced by a 3-inch (76 mm) high-angle gun. Their 4-inch guns were reduced to three, with the 'X' and 'Y' mounts landed for increased depth charge storage. The aft-most gun was replaced by four depth charge throwers. Furthermore, three 20 mm (0.79 in) cannon were added for AA defence and Type 123A asdic was installed. Two single 40 mm (1.6 in) AA guns replaced the 2-pounder guns.

== Ships in class ==
List of Aetos-class destroyers
Name	Argentine name	Builder	Launched	Fate
Aetos ('Eagle')	San Luis	Cammell Laird, Birkenhead	February 1911	Stricken 1946
Ierax ('Hawk')	Santa Fe	Cammell Laird, Birkenhead	March 1911	Stricken 1946
Panthir ('Panther')	Santiago del Estero	Cammell Laird, Birkenhead	April 1911	Stricken 1946
Leon ('Lion')	Tucumán	Cammell Laird, Birkenhead	July 1911	Sunk 15 May 1941

== History ==
The four ships in this class had originally been ordered by Argentina in 1909 from the English shipyard Cammell Laird in Birkenhead as the San Luis class. The four ships were launched in 1911 as San Luis, Santa Fe, Santiago del Estero and Tucumán. They were purchased by Greece for 148,000 pounds each in October 1912, as the outbreak of the First Balkan War was imminent, and renamed Aetos, Ierax, Panthir and Leon respectively.

The ships hoisted the Greek flag and sailed independently from Britain, still manned with Argentine crews, for Algiers. Aetos suffered a breakdown during the voyage and had to be towed to Algiers. There the ships were taken over by Greek crews, carried on the steamer Ionia. Although the ships were completely unknown to the Greeks before then, and all manuals and labels on the ship were in Spanish, within 24 hours all had been made ready to sail and began their voyage to Greece. Within a few days of arriving at the Salamis Naval Base, they were sent to join the main Greek battle fleet at Lemnos, apart from Aetos, which underwent five weeks of repairs. Due to the haste with which the purchase had been made, only limited ammunition for operations was purchased: some 3,000 shells for the ships' guns, and no torpedoes. As a result, during the First Balkan War, the ships served and were designated as "scout ships" (ανιχνευτικά) rather than destroyers (αντιτορπιλικά).

In December 1916, the French Navy landed troops near Athens to put pressure on the royal government of King Constantine I of Greece during the Greek "National Schism". After French troops were ambushed by Greeks, French naval ships fired upon the city. In retaliation for the series of events, France seized several Greek vessels, including three destroyers of the Aetos class. Aetos, Ierax and Leon were seized by France in December 1916 and placed in service with the French Navy. In French service, the ships had a complement of 102. They served with the French Navy in 1917–1918, primarily in an anti-submarine capacity. Following some objections by senior French naval officers, the Aetos class were officially returned to the Greek Navy in 1917. However, due to a shortage of trained Greek personnel and the fact that they were refitting in French naval yards, there was a delay in the actual handover. In 1918, the four destroyers, alongside the cruiser Georgios Averoff, joined the British Royal Navy's Aegean Squadron at Mudros.

Following the end of World War I, the four destroyers were extensively refitted in 1924–1925, undergoing further modifications in 1931. In World War II, after the Axis invasion of Greece, the four ships served with the Allies. Leon was damaged by German aircraft on 22 May 1941 and sunk at Suda Bay, Crete, on 15 May 1941. The remaining three were refitted in Madras, Calcutta and Port Sudan during 1941 and 1942. Ierax, Panthir and Aetos remained in service until 1945, serving under British Royal Navy control. In 1944–1945 they were made station ships. The three destroyers were discarded in 1946 following the war.

In November 1928, the Greek government announced plans to acquire four new ocean-going destroyers based on the design of the Aetos-class. This initiative formed part of a broader naval programme.

== Sources ==
- Chesneau, Roger, ed. (1980). Conway's All the World's Fighting Ships 1922–1946. Greenwich, UK: Conway Maritime Press. ISBN 0-85177-146-7.
- Couhat, Jean Labayle (1974). French Warships of World War I. London: Ian Allan. ISBN 0-7110-0445-5.
- Gardiner, Robert & Gray, Randal, eds. (1986). Conway's All the World's Fighting Ships 1906–1921. London: Conway Maritime Press. ISBN 0-85177-245-5.
- Halpern, Paul G. (2016) [1986]. The Naval War in the Mediterranean: 1914–1918. New York City: Routledge. ISBN 978-1-138-90784-3.
- Whitley, M. J. (2000) [1988]. Destroyers of World War Two: An International Encyclopedia. Annapolis, Maryland: Naval Institute Press. ISBN 0-87021-326-1.
