= List of historic aircraft of the Hellenic Air Force =

Hellenic air force seal

Image	Airplanes and helicopters	Country	Mission	Version	Number in service	Entrance in service	Retired	Notes
	Astra Hydroplane	France	Reconnaissance Naval cooperation		1	1912	1914	It had the nickname Naftilos
	Blériot XI	France	Reconnaissance Army cooperation	XI-2	1	1912	1913	
	Nieuport 4	France	Reconnaissance Army cooperation	4G	1	1912		It had the nickname Alkion
	Pelterie R.E.P. Ν	France	Reconnaissance Army cooperation		1	1912	1913	
	Farman HF.III	France	Reconnaissance Army cooperation		4	1912	1917	It had the nicknames Gypas, Ierax, Aetos and Daedalos
	Farman HF.XX	France	Reconnaissance Army cooperation		2	1912	1916	
	Farman MF.VII	France	Reconnaissance Army cooperation		4	1912	1916	
	Farman MF.VII bis hydravion	France	Reconnaissance Naval cooperation		1	1913		
	Sopwith Pusher hydroplane	United Kingdom	Trainer		1	1914		
	Sopwith Bat flying boat	United Kingdom	Naval cooperation		1	1914	1917	
	Farman HF.XXII	France	Trainer Naval cooperation		4	1914	1918	
	Royal Aircraft Factory B.E.2	United Kingdom	Trainer Army cooperation	B.E.2C/B.E.2E	4	1917	1920	
	Bristol 2 Scout	United Kingdom	Reconnaissance Fighter	C	1	1917	1918	
	Sopwith 1.5 Strutter	United Kingdom	Fighter Bomber		8	1917	1921	
	Sopwith Pup	United Kingdom	Fighter		4	1917	1919	
	Sopwith Camel	United Kingdom	Fighter		20	1917	1921	
	Fairey Hamble Hydroplane	United Kingdom	Trainer Naval cooperation Fighter		9	1917	1922	
	Breguet 14	France	Army cooperation Bomber	A2 B2	52	1917	1931	After 1931 they were used for training purposes
	Caudron G.3	France	Trainer Army cooperation		3	1917	1921	
	Dorand AR	France	Trainer Army cooperation	AR.1/AR.2	22	1917	1923	
	Farman HF.XXVII	France	Bomber		4	1917	1918	
	Short 184 hydroplane	United Kingdom	Naval cooperation		9	1918		
	Airco De Havilland D.H.4	United Kingdom	Bomber		5	1918	1922	
	Airco De Havilland D.H.6	United Kingdom	Trainer		1	1918		
	Airco De Havilland D.H.9	United Kingdom	Bomber		42	1918	1932	By 1926 six planes were converted to seaplanes
	Avro 504	United Kingdom Greece	Trainer	504K 504N/504O	12 40	1918 1926	1925 1941	During 1934–1935 an unknown number of planes was manufactured by EAF (KEA)
	SPAD S.VII	France	Fighter		16	1918	1922	
	SPAD S.XIII	France	Fighter		8	1918	1922	
	Nieuport 24/24bis	France Greece	Fighter		7	1918	1922	3 unlicensed copies built (partly utilizing used parts) in 1919 by Hellenic Air Force technical facilities
	Nieuport 27	France	Fighter		7	1918	1922	
	Ansaldo A.1	Italy	Fighter		8	1921	1923	
	Gloster Mars	United Kingdom	Fighter	Mk VI	13	1923	1941	Also known as Nieuport Nighthawk, after 1935 they were used for training purposes
	Morane-Saulnier MS.35	France	Trainer	EP2	1	1923	1926	Also known as Morane-Saulnier AR
	Bristol 81 Tourer	United Kingdom	Trainer	81A 86	6	1925	1935	
	Hanriot HD.14	France	Trainer	EP2	2	1925	1929	
	Hanriot HD.17	France	Trainer	EP2	2	1925	1929	
	Hanriot H.41	France	Trainer		2	1925	1929	
	Blackburn T.3 Velos	United Kingdom Greece	Naval cooperation	T.3A	16	1926	1939	Developed for manufacture by EAF (KEA), it was the first war plane to be manufactured by that factory
	Breguet 19	France	Army cooperation Bomber	A2 B2	72	1926	1941	
	Morane-Saulnier MS.137	France	Trainer	EP2	25	1926	1935	
	De Havilland D.H.60 Gipsy Moth	United Kingdom	Trainer		1	1927	1936	
	KEA Chelidon	Greece	Trainer Reconnaissance		1	1927	1938	Built by EAF (later known as KEA)
	Armstrong Whitworth Atlas	United Kingdom Greece	Trainer	Mk I	12	1929	1938	10 manufactured by EAF (KEA) with specific modifications
	Hawker Horsley	United Kingdom	Naval cooperation Bomber	Mk II	6	1929	1941	
	Morane-Saulnier MS.147	France	Trainer	EP2	20	1930	1936	
	Fairey III	United Kingdom	Naval cooperation	IΙIΒ IIIF Mk I IIIM	14	1931	1941	
	Potez 25	France	Army cooperation	A2 Avion Grecque	24	1931	1941	
	Morane-Saulnier MS.230	France	Trainer	ET2	18	1931	1941	
	Avia BH-33	Czechoslovakia	Fighter	BH-33SHS	5	1935	1940	
	AEKKEA-RAAB R-1C Schwalbe II	Germany Greece	Multi purpose			1935		Possibly available to the Hellenic Air Force
	AEKKEA-RAAB R-27	Germany Greece	Fighter			1935		Development reported, possibly available to the Hellenic Air Force
	Avro 621 Tutor	United Kingdom Greece	Trainer		93	1936	1941	61 Built by KEA, 4 escaped to Egypt after the German invasion
	Avia B-534	Czechoslovakia	Fighter	verze II	2	1936	1941	
	AEKKEA-RAAB R-26V, R-33 Tigerschwalbe	Greece	Fighter			1936		Possibly available to the Hellenic Air Force
	AEKKEA-RAAB R-29	Greece	Fighter			1936		Possibly available to the Hellenic Air Force
	Gloster Gladiator	United Kingdom	Fighter	Mk I Mk II	21	1937	1941	
	Avro 626 Prefect	United Kingdom	Trainer		21	1937	1941	
	PZL P-24	Poland	Fighter	P-24F P-24G	36	1937	1941	At least one built by KEA
	Dornier Do 22	Germany	Naval cooperation Army cooperation	Do 22KG	12	1938	1941	At least 1 escaped to Egypt after the German invasion
	Avro 652 Anson	United Kingdom	Trainer Transport Naval cooperation	Mk I Mk II	12 24	1939 1947	1942 1950	At least 5 escaped to Egypt after the German invasion
	Potez 633	France	Bomber	B2 Grec	12	1939	1941	
	Henschel Hs 126	Germany	Army cooperation	Hs 126K-6	16	1939	1941	At least 1 survived the German invasion and was used by Luftwaffe
	Fairey Battle	United Kingdom	Bomber	Mk I	11	1940	1941	
	Savoia-Marchetti SM.79-I	Italy	Transport Bomber		2	1940	1941	
	Bloch MB.151	France	Fighter	C1	9	1940	1941	
	Junkers G 24	Germany	Transport		4	1940	1941	
	Junkers Ju 52-3M	Germany	Transport		3	1940	1941	
	Bristol Blenheim	United Kingdom	Bomber	Mk I Mk IV (RAF) Mk IV (Greek batch) Mk V	7 12 19 31	1941 1940 1940 1942	1941 1943 1943	
	Hawker Hurricane	United Kingdom	Fighter	Mk I Mk IIB Mk IIC	50	1941	1944	
	Fieseler Fi 156	Germany	Army cooperation	C-1	3	1941	1947	
	Arado Ar 196	Germany	Reconnaissance Bomber	A-3 A-5	2	1941 1944	1949	One A-3 captured in April 1941 and one A-5 captured during the German withdrawal in 1944
	Martin 187 Baltimore	United States	Bomber	A-30A Mk III/Mk IIIA/Mk IV/Mk V	79	1943	1945	
	Supermarine Spitfire	United Kingdom	Fighter	Mk VB/VC Mk IX LF/HF Mk XVI	107 121 65	1943 1947 1949	1953 1953 1954	
	Stearman-Boeing-Kaydet 75	United States	Crop duster	PT-13 PT-17	32	1945	1969	
	Taylorcraft Auster	United Kingdom	Army cooperation	Mk III	23	1945	1953	
	Messerschmitt Bf 109	Germany	Fighter	G-6	4	1945	1947	
	Junkers Ju 290	Germany	Maritime patrol	A-5	1	1945	1949	
	North American T-6 Texan	United States	Trainer Light attacker	AT-6A T-6D T-6G	108	1946	1970	
	Stinson L-5 Sentinel	United States	Army cooperation	L-5 L-5B L-5C	7	1946	1950	
	Vickers 406 Wellington	United Kingdom	Transport Naval cooperation Bomber	Mk XIIΙ Mk XIV	19	1946	1947	
	Douglas C-47 Skytrain	United States	Transport	C-47A C-47B C-47D	89	1947	2008	The British nicknamed it Dakota from a name of some Indian tribes such as the Lakota and Nakota
	Airspeed AS.10 Oxford	United Kingdom	Trainer Transport	Mk I/Mk II	36	1947	1949	
	De Havilland D.H.82 Tiger Moth	United Kingdom	Trainer	D.H.82A Tiger Moth II	17	1947	1955	
	North American-Ryan L-17 Navion	United States	Liaison	L-17B	5	1948	1959	
	Curtiss SB2C Helldiver	United States	Bomber	SB2C-5	42	1949	1954	
	Piper PA-18 Super Cub	United States	Army cooperation	L-18B L-18C L-21B	66	1950	1983	
	Lockheed T-33 Silver Star	United States	Trainer	T-33A	150	1951	2000	
	Beechcraft C-45 Expeditor	United States	Radio control General usage	C-45F	1	1951	1965	
	Republic F-84 Thunderjet	United States	Fighter Bomber	F-84G	200	1952	1959	
	North American F-86 Sabre	United States	Fighter	F-86D Sabre Dog F-86E	100	1960 1954	1969 1965	
	Republic RF-84F Thunderflash	United States	Reconnaissance		43	1956	1991	
	Republic F-84F Thunderstreak	United States	Fighter Bomber		150	1957	1983	
	De Havilland Canada DHC-2 Beaver	Canada	Trainer General usage		2	1957	1974	
	Sikorsky H-19 Chickasaw	United States	Search and rescue helicopter	UH-19B UH-19D	17	1958	1971	
	Bell 47	United States	Trainer and reconnaissance helicopter	G-3 G-5 J-2 OH-13H OH-13S Sioux	79	1961	2005	
	Cessna T-37 Tweet	United States	Trainer	T-37B T-37C	43	1963	2002	
	Grumman G-159 Gulfstream I	United States	Staff transfer		1	1963	1995	
	Lockheed F-104 Starfighter	United States	Fighter Bomber	F-104G RF-104G TF-104G	146	1964	1993	
	Northrop F-5 Freedom Fighter	United States	Fighter Bomber	F-5Α/Β NF-5A/B RF-5Α	149	1965	2001	
	Aero Commander 680	United States	Aerial photography	680F 680FL	3	1966	1998	
	Nord Noratlas	France	Transport	N.2501D	50	1967	1982	
	Convair F-102 Delta Dagger	United States	Interceptor	F-102Α ΤF-102Α	20 2	1969	1977	
	Cessna T-41 Mescalero	United States	Trainer	T-41D	21	1969	2022	
	Grumman HU-16 Albatross	United States	Naval cooperation flying boat		12	1969	1997	
	LTV A-7 Corsair II	United States	Bomber	A-7E A-7H TA-7C TA-7H	127	1975	2014	
	Dassault Mirage F.1	France	Fighter	F.1CG	40	1975	2003	

== See also ==
- List of aircraft of the Hellenic Air Force
