= Raab-Katzenstein KL.1 Schwalbe =

German two-seat biplane

KL.1 Schwalbe
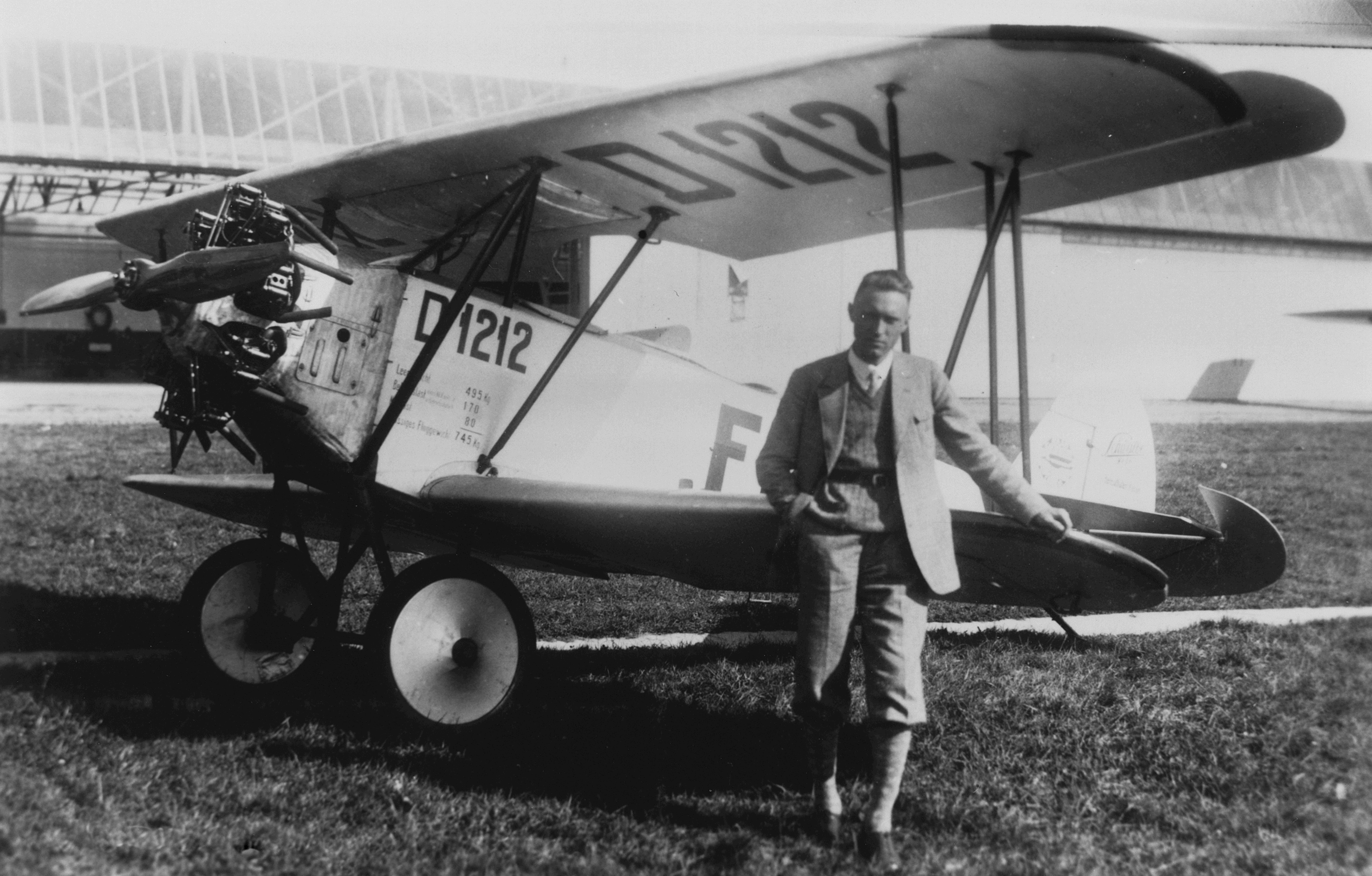
- KL.1C Schwalbe with pilot Gerhard Fieseler

General information
- Type: Sport and aerobatic aircraft
- National origin: Germany
- Manufacturer: Raab-Katzenstein-Flugzeugwerke GmbH
- Number built: c.50

History
- First flight: 16 January 1926
- Developed from: Dietrich-Gobiet DP.XI

The Raab-Katzenstein KL.1 Schwalbe (Swallow) was a German two-seat biplane produced in the 1920s. About fifty were built and the type became well known as an aerobatic aircraft, performing at many displays in the hands of pilots like Gerhard Fieseler.

== Design and development ==
In November 1925 test pilot Antonius Raab and engineer Katzenstein formed the Kassel-based company that bears their name. They had previously worked at Dietrich Flugzeugwerke, a company which ran into financial problems in 1925. Their first design, known initially as the KL.1 Schwalbe, was a development of the Dietrich-Gobiet DP.XI. Later, in a rationalisation of the company's naming system, it became the RK.1 Schwalbe.

The Schwalbe was a single bay biplane with thick sections, unequal span wooden wings which were built around twin spars and fabric covered. The wings had marked stagger and were braced between the spars with forward leaning, steel tube, N-form interplane struts. The lower wing was attached directly to the lower fuselage, from which the inner upper wing was braced with an outward leaning pair of parallel struts to the spars and held over the upper fuselage by a pair of inverted V-struts, one on each side, to the forward spar alone. The wings were straight-tapered in plan, with only a slight sweep on the leading edge, out to rounded tips. They also tapered in thickness. The Schwalbe had ailerons on both wings, externally connected with vertical rods. The upper ailerons had large balances to serve both surfaces.

The Schwalbe's rectangular section fuselage had a steel tube structure and was fabric covered. The first examples, designated KL.IA, were powered by a 60 kW (80 hp) Siemens-Halske Sh 11 seven cylinder radial engine, partially enclosed by a dural cowling which left the cylinders projecting for cooling. Its fuel tank was within the upper wing and the oil tank behind a firewall. Two later versions of the Schwalbe, designated KL.1B and KL.IC, were powered by an 82 kW (110 hp) Siemens-Halske Sh 12 nine cylinder radial. The forward open cockpit was under the wing but it was flown solo from the rear cockpit which was over the trailing edge of the lower wing and behind that of the upper wing, where there was a cut-out to increase the pilot's field of view.

A large, almost triangular tailplane was mounted on top of the fuselage and carried generous, curved and balanced elevators. Its fin was small but the rudder large and balanced, reaching down to the keel and working in an elevator cut-out.

The Schwalbe had fixed, conventional landing gear, with its mainwheels on a split axle sprung by rubber cords to V-struts from the lower fuselage and stabilized centrally by a transverse V-strut. There was a short, steel tailskid.

== Operational history ==
Piloted by Raab, the Schwalbe first flew on 16 January 1926. While the total number of units built is uncertain, the approximate number between forty-two and fifty-eight. Engines apart, the unknown differences between the variants were small enough to allow several airframes to have been IAs, IBs and ICs over their lifetime.

Several well known pilots used them as aerobatic aircraft, including Gerhard Fieseler who was regarded as the best and most innovative aerobatic pilot of his day. In September 1927 he claimed a world duration record for inverted flight in his Schwalbe KL.IC. at a Zürich meeting, then bettered it later in the month with a fifteen-minute flight. He gave aerobatic demonstrations in his Schwalbe during 1927–28 at several other European meetings including Blackpool and Waalhaven.

One Schwalbe was on display at the 1928 Berlin International Aero Show.

== Variants ==
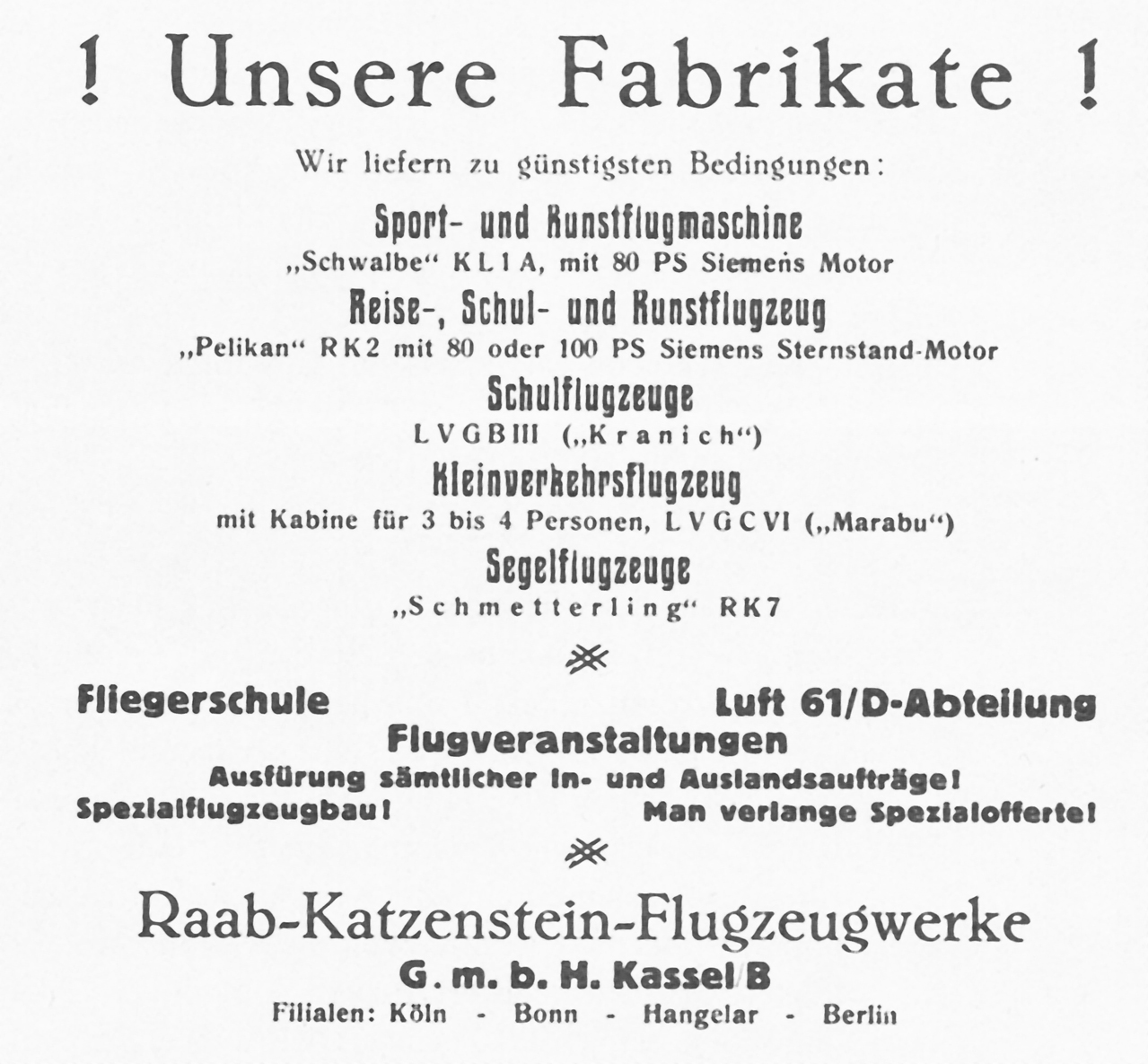
Company catalogue advertising the KL.IA variant

KL.IA
Original design with 60 kW (80 hp) Siemens-Halske Sh 11 engine.

KL.IB
More powerful 82 kW (110 hp) Siemens-Halske Sh 12.

KL.IC
Siemens-Halske Sh 12.

Schwalbe II
Version of KL.IC built in Greece by AEKKEA-RAAB, which was established in 1935.

Pintsch Schwalbe II
derivative by Pintsch

Rheinische FR-2 Schwalbe
Derivative by Flugzeugbau Rheinische

== Specifications (KL. 1A) ==
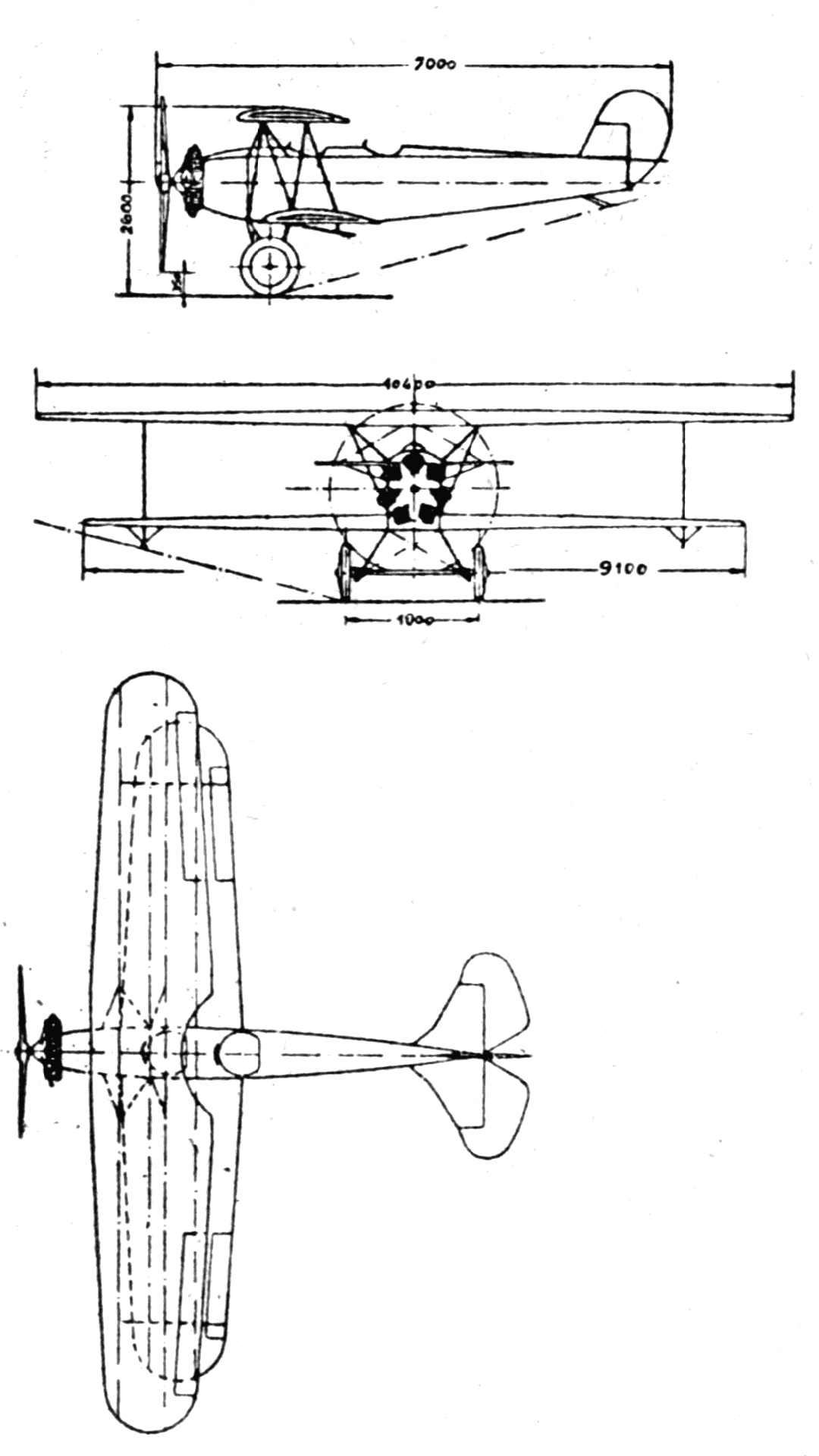
Raab-Katzenstein RK 1a Schwalbe 3-view drawing from L'Air January 1, 1927

Data from Les Ailes, September 1927

General characteristics

- Crew: One
- Capacity: one passenger
- Length: 6.50 m (21 ft 4 in)
- Upper wingspan: 8 m (26 ft 3 in)
- Lower wingspan: 7 m (23 ft 0 in)
- Height: 2.60 m (8 ft 6 in)
- Wing area: 17 m^{2} (180 sq ft)
- Empty weight: 470 kg (1,036 lb)
- Gross weight: 710 kg (1,565 lb)
- Fuel capacity: 100 L (22 imp gal; 26 US gal)
- Powerplant: 1 × Siemens-Halske Sh 11 7-cylinder radial, 60 kW (80 hp) nominal
- Propellers: 2-bladed wooden

Performance

- Maximum speed: 152 km/h (94 mph, 82 kn)
- Cruise speed: 140 km/h (87 mph, 76 kn)
- Stall speed: 70 km/h (43 mph, 38 kn) minimum speed
- Range: 500 km (310 mi, 270 nmi)
- Service ceiling: 3,500 m (11,500 ft)
- Time to altitude: 9 min to 1,000 m (3,300 ft)

== Bibliography ==
- Gerdessen, Frederik. "Estonian Air Power 1918 – 1945". Air Enthusiast, No. 18, April – July 1982. pp. 61–76. ISSN 0143-5450.
