= Waldau Airfield =

Former German military airfield near Kassel

Waldau Airfield Waldau Army Airfield Advanced Landing Ground Y-96 Fliegerhorst Waldau
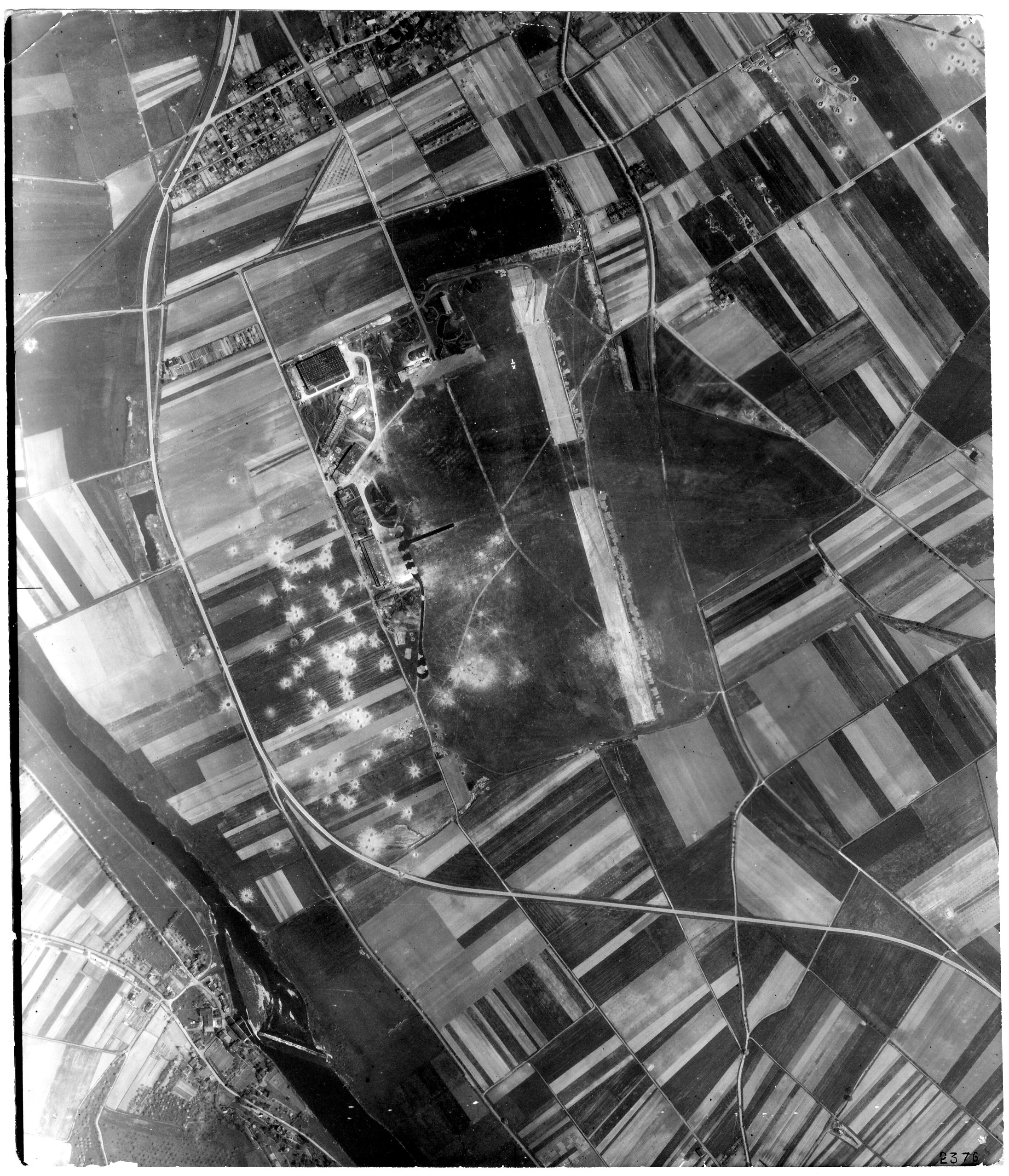
- Aerial view of Waldau Airfield
- IATA: none; ICAO: none

Summary
- Airport type: Former Military Air Base
- Serves: Kassel, Germany
- Location: Kassel-Waldau, Germany
- Coordinates: 51°16′53″N 009°30′20″E

Map
- Location in Germany

Runways
Direction	Length		Surface
Direction	ft	m	Surface
01/19	4,000x120	1,250x35	Concrete

Waldau Airfield (also known as Advanced landing ground Y-96) is a former military and civilian airfield located 4 kilometres (2.5 mi) south of Kassel, Hesse, Germany. It was operational during World War I then expanded in the interwar years for aircraft production, expanding further for use by the Luftwaffe during World War II.

== History ==
=== 1918 - 1945 ===
During World War I, Waldau Airfield (Kassel-Waldau Airfield) was built in 1918 and was primarily a minor airfield used by the German military for training and reconnaissance purposes. Aviation in World War I was still in its relatively early stages, and airfields like Waldau were used to support operations with the newly developed military aircraft. These early airfields were often smaller, more rudimentary, and focused on biplanes used for observation, communication, and light bombing missions.

During the interwar years, it had its first building in 1924, the same year it was officially opened. As early as 1925, Cassel (Kassel) was part of the route network of Junkers Luftverkehr AG. Following its establishment in 1926, Lufthansa also included Waldau Airfield in its scheduled routes, offering international connections to cities like Prague and Amsterdam. At the time, Lufthansa's operations received direct subsidies.

In the spring of 1926, World War I flying ace and aerobatic champion Gerhard Fieseler, hailing from Eschweiler, arrived at Waldau to work as a flight instructor for Raab-Katzenstein (RaKa). From 1927 onward, he used the airfield as a base for his aerobatic endeavors and later for establishing his aircraft manufacturing company.

During the spring of 1927, RaKa pioneered the development of glider towing at the Kassel-Waldau Airfield. This innovation was publicly demonstrated for the first time by Fieseler and Katzenstein during the "Großflugtag" (Grand Flight Day) on April 18, 1927, at Kassel-Waldau. The first successful airplane tow of a glider was done at Waldau Airfield on 12 March 1927 by Gerhard Fieseler in the tow plane and Gottlob Espenlaub in the glider.

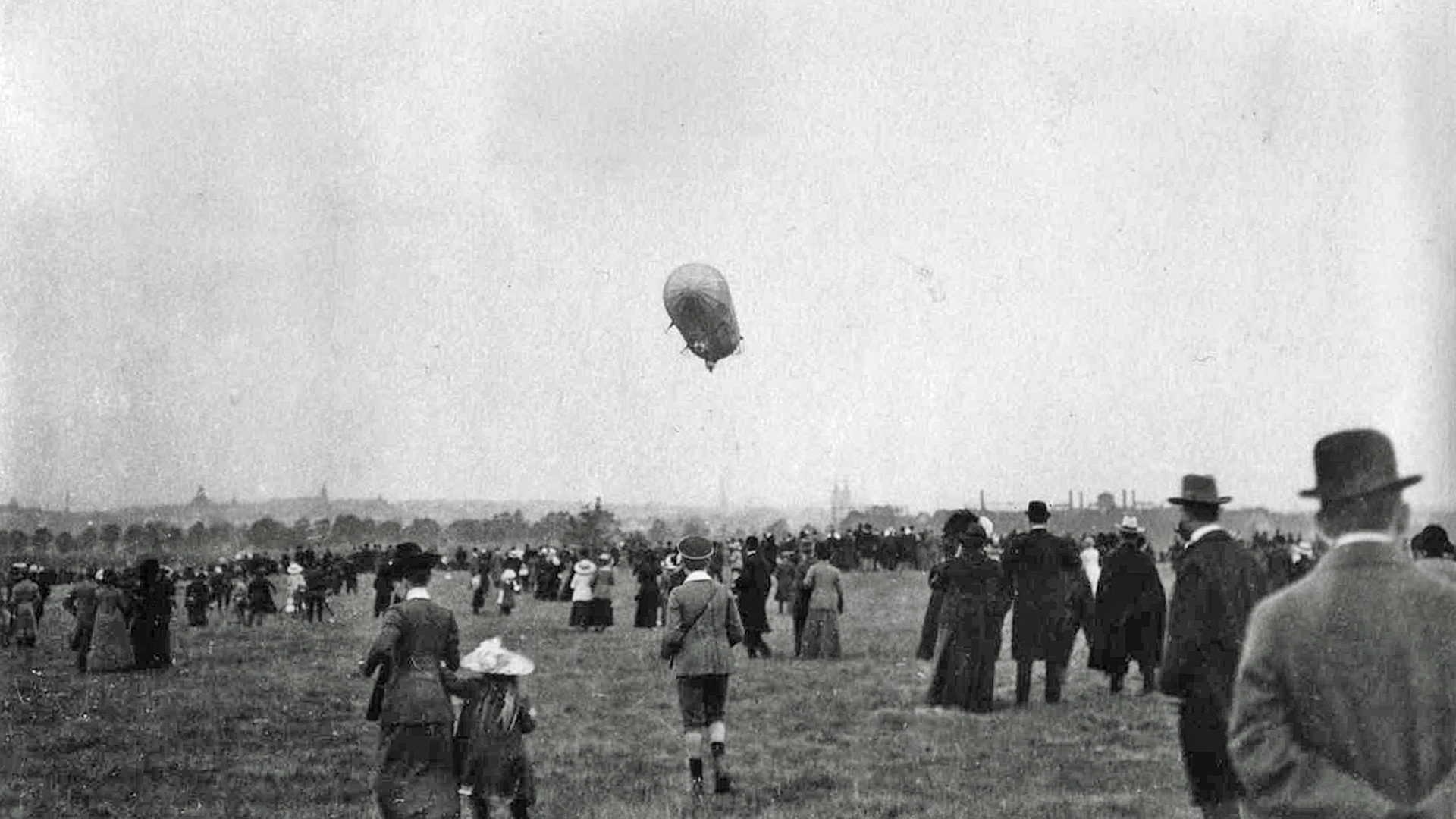
LZ 127 Zeppelin at Kassel (1912).

On September 3, 1930, the LZ 127 Graf Zeppelin visited Kassel. Its landing here drew a crowd of over 100,000 spectators.

That same year the airline connection ended, when Waldau had to close as a city airfield because Kassel could no longer afford to pay Lufthansa for its services or the maintenance of the airfield. Ownership of the airfield was then transferred to the Lower Hessian Association for Aviation. Still, the airfield remained open. Gerhard Fieseler set up his aircraft production plants at Kassel in 1930 as Fieseler Flugzeugbau. One of them (Werk III, or Plant III) was at Waldau Airfield, another one only one mile from the airfield.

Aircraft Fieseler produced 8 types of Aircraft:

- Fieseler Fi 2 a German aerobatic biplane built in the 1930s.
- Fieseler Fi 5 a single-engine, two-seat sport plane of the 1930s, and later used as a Luftwaffe trainer.
- Fieseler Fi 98, a prototype ground-attack aircraft (before World War II).
- Fieseler Fi 167 a biplane torpedo and reconnaissance bomber designed for the new aircraft carriers being planned. (before World War II).
- Fieseler Fi 156 Storch, a STOL observation/liaison aircraft (from 1936 until 1943).
- Messerschmitt Bf 109 fighter (licence production).
- Focke-Wulf Fw 190 fighter (licence production, from 1943 onwards).
- Fieseler Fi 103, better known as the V-1 flying bomb "Buzz bomb", an early pulse-jet-powered predecessor of the cruise missile (1944-1945).

At times the plants used 10,000 working men and women, many of them slave labor from the Netherlands and France, who were forced to work under brutal conditions. As a result, the Fieseler plants regularly were attacked by American Eighth Air Force and British RAF Bomber Command aircraft, and although some damage was done to the plants, most destruction occurred in the city itself.

The strategic importance of the Fieseler plants made them key targets for Allied bombing campaigns. Despite repeated bombing raids by the American Eighth Air Force and British RAF Bomber Command, the Fieseler factories were often able to continue production, although the nearby city of Kassel suffered extensive damage. The air raids devastated large portions of Kassel, resulting in significant civilian casualties and the destruction of much of the city's infrastructure.

=== 1945 - 1970 ===
The damaged airfield was seized by American Army units on 4 April 1945. The damaged airfield was repaired by IX Engineering Command, Ninth Air Force and re-designated as "Advanced Landing Ground Y-96". American Army Air Force units used the airfield as a casualty evacuation and combat resupply airfield by the IX Air Service Command, as well as a combat airfield by the 48th Fighter Group with Republic P-47 Thunderbolts operating for two weeks until the German capitulation on 8 May.

After the end of combat, the facility was re-designed as "AAF Station Kassel/Waldau" and later "Waldau Tactical Air Depot" (TAD) under Air Service Command, operated by 10th Air Depot Group. In November 1945, Air Force units moved out and control of the facility was turned over to the United States Army. The airfield remained closed to civilian traffic until 29 April 1955, when it was returned to the city of Kassel for civilian use as an airport, the US Army retaining control of the base station and renaming the facility "Waldau Kaserne". The Army used the station for vehicle maintenance by 547th Ordnance Company which supported transportation units. In 1970, the Army inactivated the facility.

== Closure ==
By the early 1960s, however, urban encroachment in the area made it clear the civil airport could not remain open much longer. It was located in the eastern side of the city with no room for expansion and residential areas were becoming hard to avoid. When the city of Kassel opened the new airport Kassel-Calden to the north of the city in July 1970, Waldau was closed and converted to an industrial area. The airfield remained in existence until the 1980s, when it was torn up and the area redeveloped.

== See also ==
- Gerhard Fieseler
- Raab-Katzenstein
- LZ 127 Graf Zeppelin
