= Timeline of the Hellenic Air Force =

== 1911–1912 ==
In 1911 the Greek Government appointed French specialists to form the Hellenic Aviation Service. Six Greek officers were sent to France for training, while the first four "Farman" type aircraft were ordered. The first Greek aviator was Emmanuel Argyropoulos, who flew in a Nieuport IV.G. "Alcuin" aircraft, on February 8, 1912.

The first military flight was made on 13 May of that year by Lieutenant Dimitrios Kamberos. In June, Kamberos, flew with the "Daedalus", a Farman Aviation Works aircraft that had been converted into a seaplane, setting the foundations of Naval Aviation. That September, the Greek Army fielded its first squadron, the Aviators Company (Λόχος Αεροπόρων).

== 1919–1944 ==
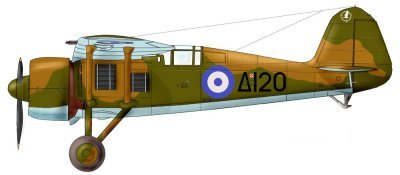
A PZL P.24, the main Greek fighter in the Greco-Italian War (1940, WWII)

The Hellenic Air Force participated in the Balkan Wars, World War I, the Asia Minor Campaign and World War II. In 1922 it made its first largescale purchase of aircraft, acquiring 25 Gloster Mk VI Nighthawks. 10 Armstrong Whitworth Atlas aircraft were purchased in 1928 for the naval aviation branch built under license by KEA.

Initially it consisted of the separate Army Aviation and Naval Aviation, but in 1930 the Aviation Ministry was founded, establishing the Air Force as the third branch of the Hellenic Armed Forces. In 1931 the Air Force Academy, the "Icarus School of Basic and Advanced Fighter Training" (Sholi Icaron), was founded. That same year the air force acquired French-made aircraft: 30 Bréguet 19 and 30 Potez 30s. The naval branch remained with British suppliers and purchased six Hawker Horsley IIs and six Fairey IIIFs.

Greece built 61 Avro 621 training aircraft and acquired seven Avia B-534s from Yugoslavia before 1936 when rearmament began under Prime Minister Ioannis Metaxas. Two Gloster Gladiator mk1 aircraft were donated to the air force by a Greek businessman in 1937. The Hellenic Air Force acquired 30 PZL P.24Fs and six PZL P.24Gs that were assembled by Polish technicians in Greece in 1938 (with at least one built under license by KEA in 1939). An order was placed for 24 Bloch MB.151 aircraft in 1939 but only nine were delivered before the 1940 fall of France.

During the Second World War, it successfully resisted the Italian invasion in 1940, but practically the entire force was destroyed by the Germans in April 1941. The Air Force was rebuilt in the Middle East as part of the Royal Air Force, flying Spitfires, Hurricanes and Martin Baltimores.

After Greece's liberation in 1944, it returned home and subsequently participated in the Greek Civil War.

== 1950s ==
In the 1950s, the force was rebuilt and organized according to NATO standards. The Greek Air Force participated in the Korean War with a transport flight unit.

== 1980s ==
Until the late 1980s the Air Force deployed Nike-Hercules Missiles armed with U.S. nuclear warheads. As a result of Greco-Turkish tensions around the 1974 Turkish invasion of Cyprus, the U.S. removed its nuclear weapons from Greek and Turkish alert units to storage. Greece saw this as another pro-Turkish move by NATO and withdrew its forces from NATO's military command structure from 1974 to 1980.

In 1988 the first 3rd generation fighters were introduced, marking the beginning of a new era: The first Mirage 2000 EG/BG aircraft were delivered to the 114th Combat Wing and equipped the 331 and 332 squadrons.

In January 1989, the first F-16C/D Block 30 arrived in Nea Anchialos (111th Combat Wing) and were allocated between the 330 and 346 squadrons.

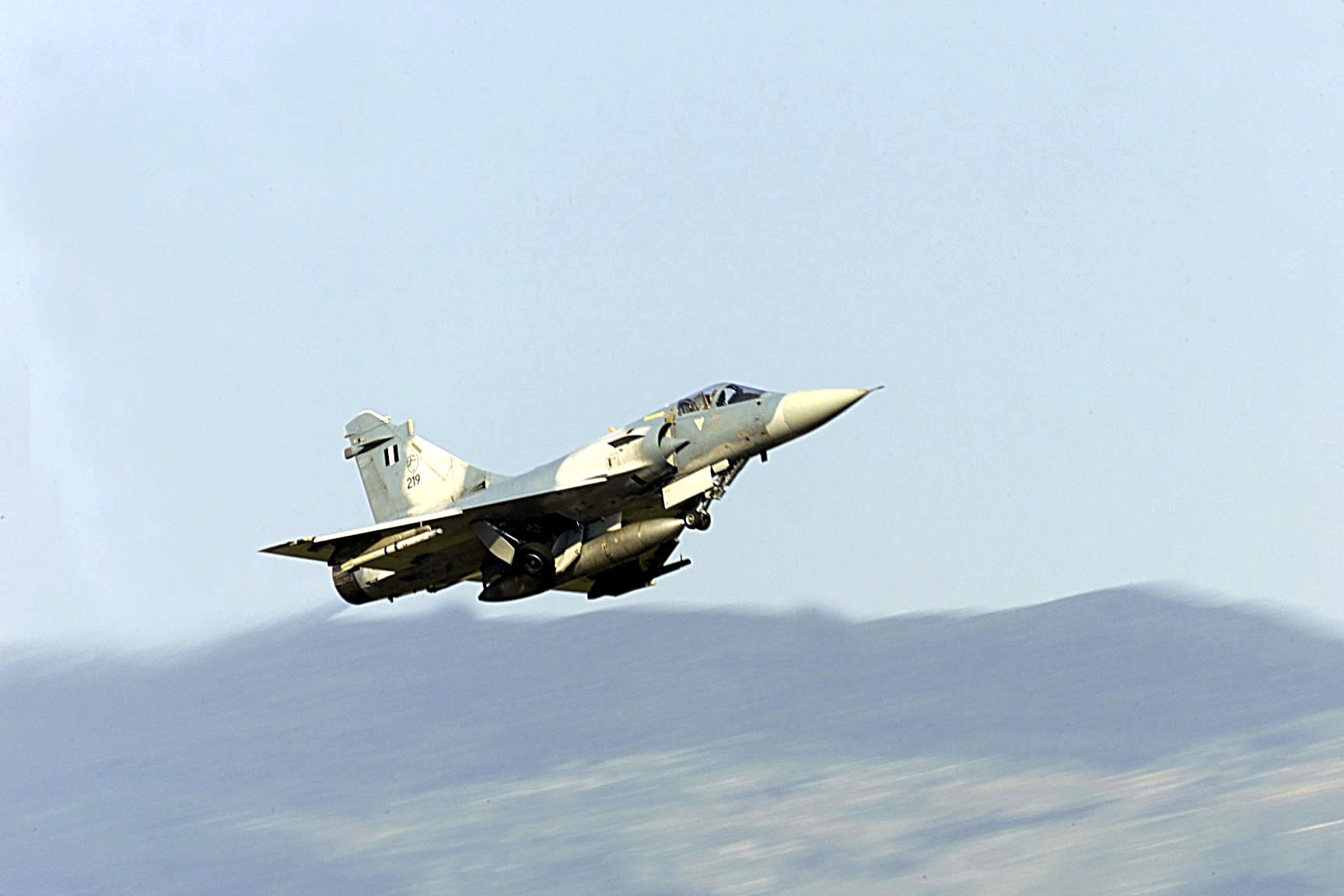
Greek Mirage 2000EG

== 1990s ==
On March 29, 1991, the RF-84F were retired from service after 34 years and 7 months of operational life. In November 1992 more RF-4E were delivered to the 348 Tactical Reconnaissance Squadron.

In 1997 the reception of third generation aircraft continued. In July, delivery of forty F-16 Block 50 begun. The new aircraft, equipped with the LANTIRN navigation and targeting pod as well as AMRAAM and HARM missiles, were allocated to the 341 and 347 squadrons.

== 2000–2007 ==
Eurofighter Typhoon. One of the prime 4th generation aircraft candidates for the Hellenic Air Force

Greece participated in NATO "nuclear weapons sharing" until 2001, using A-7 Corsair IIs to deploy tactical B61 nuclear warheads from Araxos Air Base. Greece then strategically decided to remove all nuclear weapons under storage in Greece and did not purchase any more aircraft with nuclear capabilities.

In 2005, Greece was among the first countries to add the F-16 Block 52+ to its inventory. Ninety of these aircraft were ordered and delivery began the same year. This advanced F-16 type is an improved version of the Block 50 featuring a more powerful radar, better communications systems and an upgraded engine. The Hellenic Air Force's Block 52+ belong to the 337, 340 and 343 Squadrons with call signs "Ghost", "Fox" and "Star" respectively. 337 SQ is based at Larissa Air Force Base (110 Combat Wing) and the other two in Souda AB (115 CW).

In 2007, the Hellenic Air Force has a total fighter fleet of 275 modern, upgraded or under upgrade aircraft and due to the retirement of some fighter planes that have ended their life-cycle, HAF is looking forward to acquiring new 3rd and 4th generation fighters in order to reach a total number of 300 modern fighters, according to the "2007 Supreme Air Force Council Memorandum" published in 2007. This goal is to be gradually reached by 2015. Prime candidates for a 4th generation aircraft, of which acquisition is considered certain, are the Eurofighter Typhoon, F-35 Lightning II (JSF) and Dassault Rafale.
