= Bukovel (counter unmanned aircraft system) =

Ukrainian Anti-Drone System

Bukovel-AD
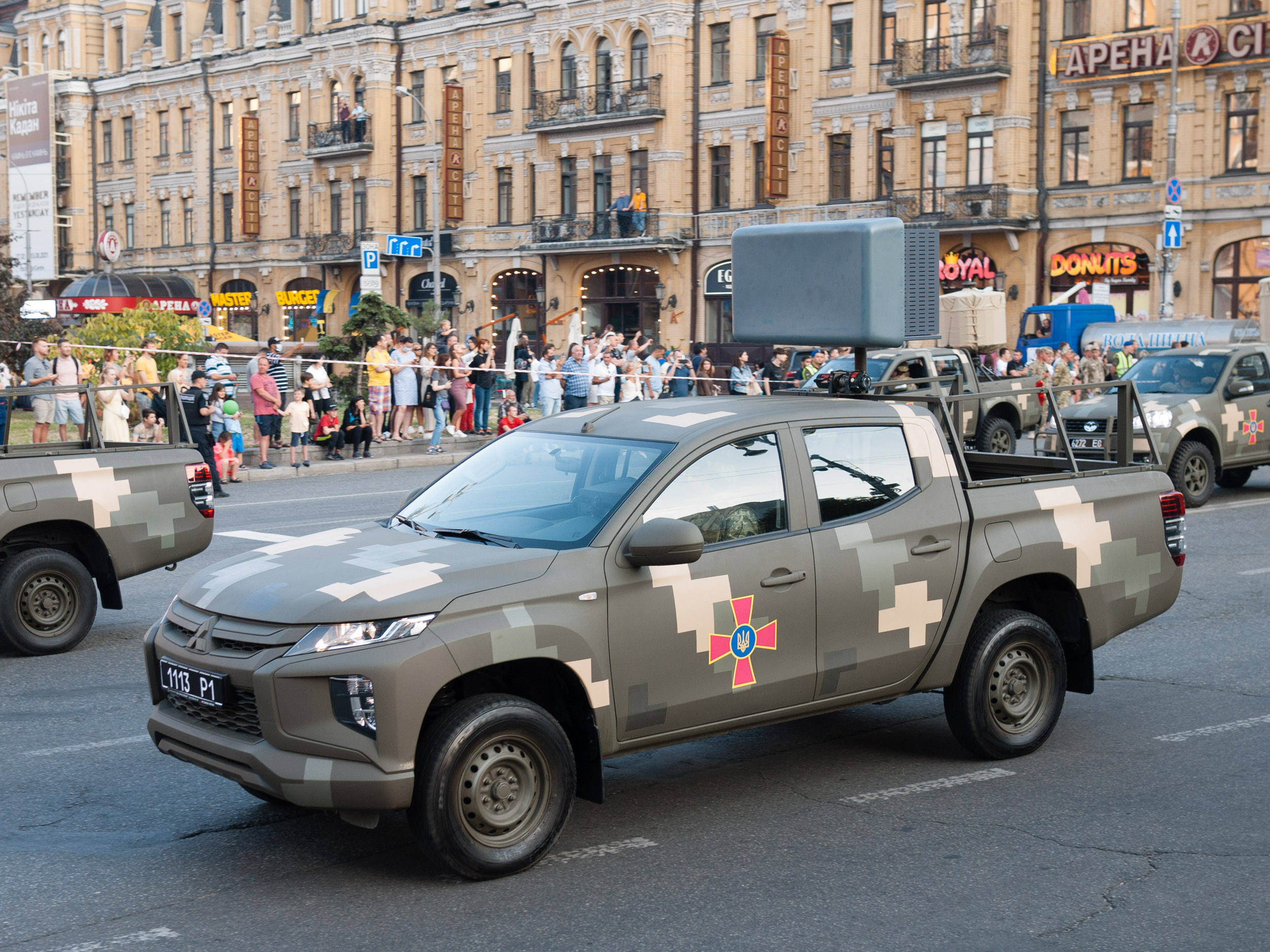
- Bukovel-AD mounted on a light truck in rehearsal for the Ukrainian 2021 Independence Day Parade
- Type: counter-unmanned aircraft system
- Place of origin: Ukraine

Service history
- In service: 2016–present
- Used by: Ukraine, Morocco
- Wars: Russo-Ukrainian war

Production history
- Designer: Proximus LLC
- Designed: 2015
- Manufacturer: Proximus LLC

Specifications
- Effective firing range: 16–20 km jamming, 70–100 km detection
- Maximum firing range: 200 km

The Bukovel-AD (Ukrainian: Буковель-AD) is a Ukrainian anti-drone electronic warfare system.

== Description ==
The Bukovel-AD is a counter-unmanned aircraft system (CUAS) produced by the Ukrainian firm Proximus. It is designed to detect unmanned aerial vehicles (UAVs) at up to 100 km range and jam data transmission between the UAV and its controllers at 20 km. It can block GPS, GLONASS, Galileo, and Beidou positioning systems. The system can be mounted on various vehicles, as well as on tripods and takes two minutes to deploy. The technology of the Bukovel-AD has reportedly influenced other anti-drone systems, such as the Greek Centauros. Some defense analysts have noted technical similarities between the two, suggesting that the Centauros may be based on or produced under license from the Bukovel system.

== Operational history ==
The Ukrainian Armed Forces have used the Bukovel-AD in the war in Donbass, bringing down Russian Orlan-10 drones.

== Operators ==
Ukraine

- Armed Forces of Ukraine - several dozen units in service.

Morocco

- Royal Moroccan Army

== See also ==
Indrajaal Drone Defence Dome
