= Hellenic Aerospace Industry =

Greek aerospace company

Hellenic Aerospace Industry SA Ελληνική Αεροπορική Βιομηχανία
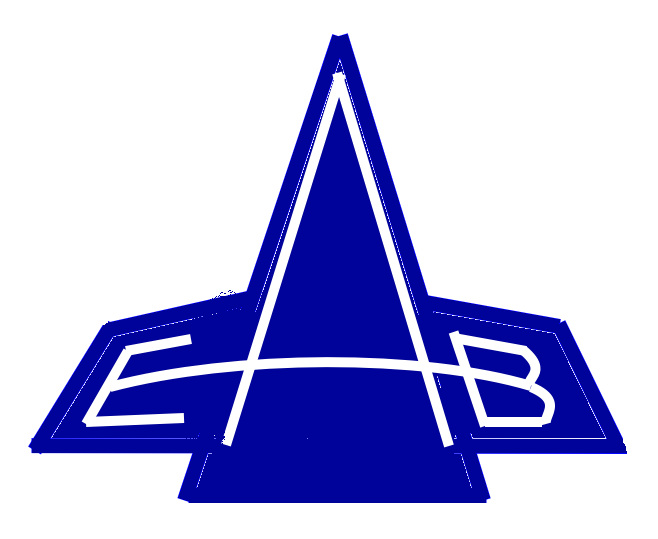
- Company type: S.A. (corporation)
- Industry: Aerospace; Defence; Telecommunications
- Founded: 1975; 51 years ago
- Founder: Greek Government
- Headquarters: Tanagra, Greece
- Key people: Panagiotis Manousos (Chairman)
- Products: Aircraft Projects; Aviation Upgrades; Defence Systems
- Revenue: ▲€98.02 million (2014)
- Operating income: ▲€26.53 million (2014)
- Net income: ▲€13.69 million (2014)
- Total assets: ▲€932.52 million (2014)
- Total equity: ▲€196.50 million (2014)
- Owner: Greek Government (100%)
- Number of employees: 2,000 (2021)
- Parent: Hellenic Defence Systems (HDS); Ελληνικά Αμυντικά Συστήματα (ΕΑΣ)
- Website: www.haicorp.com

Hellenic Aerospace Industry (HAI) (Greek: Ελληνική Αεροπορική Βιομηχανία - ΕΑΒ) is the leading aerospace company of Greece. The company headquarters is located in Tanagra, 65 kilometers north-west of Athens, with the industrial complex covering an area of 200,000 sq.m.

The company has undertaken over the years extensive subcontracting work with major international aerospace companies such as Boeing, Airbus, Alenia, Lockheed Martin, Raytheon, EADS and others. The company has also accomplished original developments in unmanned aviation structures, military electronics, telecommunications equipment, night vision equipment, wind generators and composite material technology.

Original designs include a number of Unmanned Aerial Vehicles, the Pegasus and Pegasus II UAVs, first flown in 1982 and still in service with the Hellenic Air Force.

Industrial capability is organized by production centers geared to deliver high technology services and products in a wide range of activities, that include:

- Military aircraft and engine maintenance, repair, overhaul, modifications, upgrades and logistics support
- Development, design, manufacturing and after sales support of electronic, optronic and telecommunication products, satellite systems and applications, co-development and co-production of weapon systems.
- Aerostructures manufacturing and assembly
- Repair and calibration of precision measuring devices and equipment

HAI's Quality System is certified by BVQI, ISO 9001:2000, ISO 9001:1994 and TickIT Guide and EN/AS 9100. The company applies Total quality management and Six Sigma (6σ) methodology. In addition, HAI has been inspected, verified and accepted by nearly every major manufacturer in the sector of Aerospace Industries.

HAI has been approved and certified by the HCAA (Hellenic Civil Aviation Authority) as a repair center to provide services for Civil aircraft components and engines in compliance to JAR-145 requirements and by major engine manufacturers for the repair and overhaul of engines, such as T53 by Honeywell Aerospace, T56/501D by Rolls-Royce and ATAR K-50 by Snecma Moteurs.

Furthermore, it has been approved and certified as a maintenance center for the C-130 aircraft by Lockheed Aeronautics, King Air aircraft by Raytheon and P-3 aircraft by the Hellenic Navy.

In January 2025, it was announced by Defence Minister Dendias that the new Centaur counter-UAV system by HAI will be ready for serial production soon.

== History ==
HAI was founded by the Greek State in 1975, by decision of Constantine Karamanlis' government, to undertake all aircraft-related construction activity, so that the historic KEA factory would concentrate on maintenance work. A huge factory was built in Tanagra, 65 km north of Athens eventually employing thousands.

In 1979 the development of the E1-79 Pegasus, an Unmanned Aerial Vehicle (UAV), was begun in collaboration with KETA (Hellenic Air Force Research & Development Center) and its first flight was made in 1982. By 2003 it was already operational, being upgraded in 2005 to Pegasus II level.

Other similar projects by HAI include the TELAMON, a very advanced, jet-powered UAV, jointly developed with Northrop, based on the latter's Chuckar III UAV. It was introduced in 1986 but the project did not proceed, considered too expensive for the Hellenic Air Force requirements.

In 1990, HAI developed in collaboration with DASA of Germany, Alenia of Italy and Per Udsen of Denmark the "Advanced Amphibious Aircraft" (AAA) which, however, was not produced. Other developments that were not completed mostly for financial reasons at the time, include a trainer for the Hellenic Air Force of own design and many joint projects.

In 1996, HAI entered the "F-16 Fighting Falcon" co-production program with Lockheed Martin.

In 2000 HAI has joined the "Next Generation Fighter" program, an experimental Unmanned Combat Air Vehicle (UCAV), undertaking the construction of the rear fuselage, the tail pipe, the integration bench, the Engine, the Air to Air Missiles and the Communications System of the aircraft. HAI also joined the "Eurotrainer" development and co-production program with Dassault Aviation, EADS, Saab AB, RUAG and Alenia.

In January 2006, HAI signed a Memorandum of Understanding with Aermacchi for the "M-346 Advanced Trainer" co-production project.

In March 2007, HAI joined EADS in the "Eurofighter" project, undertaking the construction of a composite fuselage part (Vary Cowl) for the Typhoon. On the 29th of that month, HAI signed a Memorandum of Understanding with the Russian Aerospace Industry Irkut, for the co-production of the Russian firefighting aircraft Beriev Be-200 if it is to be chosen by the Hellenic Air Force in the near future. In April 2007, HAI signed an agreement with the United States Air Force for the structural and electronic upgrade (CCIP) of all US F-16 fighters that harbor in Europe, in its facilities in Greece. This agreement concerns approximately 100 aircraft of the US Air Force. The program begun in November 2007 and the first upgraded US fighter was delivered to the US Air Force in March 2008.

Since 2005 HAI has been actively involved in the design and construction of part of the new Boeing Dreamliner 787 and specifically the CDS (Cargo Door Surround) of this new airliner. The aircraft is the first environmentally friendly aircraft to be exclusively constructed by composite material. HAI looks forward to be the exclusive supplier of the CDS worldwide and construction will begin in the mid 2008. HAI is also involved in the design and construction, using composite material, of the prototype part of the internal force structure of the wing of the new AIRBUS A380 (TANGO project).

In 2010, the Hellenic Aerospace Industry was considered one of several Greek state owned enterprises requiring restructuring, because it had a primary revenue deficit.

== Field of works ==
=== Aircraft maintenance ===
The Aircraft Maintenance Facilities cover a wide range of military & civil fixed and rotary wing aircraft. All aircraft accessories, components and avionics are covered. Services include depot level maintenance, major electromechanical, pneumatic and electronic systems, modification/upgrade programs on aircraft and avionics systems, structural reworks, aircraft painting and corrosion control. In addition the facilities can undertake crash damage repair for a large number of aircraft types.

With regard to Civil Aviation aircraft, HAI provide technical support on "A" and "B" level checks and is increasing this capability to "C" and "D" checks. HAI's Aircraft & Accessories maintenance capabilities cover a large number of aircraft types, such as:

- C-130/L-100
- F-4
- A-7
- F-16
- Mirage F1
- Mirage 2000
- UH-1H/Bell 204/205
- UH-1N/Bell 212
- T-2
- CL-215
- P-3 Orion
- Other

=== Engine maintenance ===
The Engine Maintenance Facilities cover an area of 16,000 sq.m which house 18 production shops capable of providing repair, overhaul, modification and testing to a wide range of aircraft turbofan, turbojet, turboshaft, turboprop and reciprocating engines. The Engine Maintenance Business Unit is an authorized service center to provide maintenance support to third parties for:

- Snecma Atar 09K50 & M53
- Rolls-Royce - Allison T56 (Military and Civil versions)
- Honeywell Aerospace T53 and APU 85.184.

The Engines Maintenance Business Unit performs activities on:

- Design and development of engine repair schemes
- Design of special tools and equipment for the engine maintenance operations
- Engine or parts life extension studies
- Plan specific processes as well as engine inspections and investigations

=== Electronics ===
The Electronics Facilities are housed in a 16,000 sq. m. building and include four major activity areas :

- Electronics Maintenance
  - Aircraft Avionics-Instruments
  - Ground and Weapon Systems Radars - Telecomm & Electronics ground-based equipment
  - Air to Air Missiles
- Electronics Manufacturing, Assembly and Testing
  - Electronics Manufacturing and Assembly
  - Electronics Testing
  - Weapon Systems Manufacturing and Assembly
- Production Methods and Control
- Engineering, Research and Development Support

=== Aerostructures ===
The Aerostructures Manufacturing Business Unit is housed in a building covering an area of 29,000 sq.m. and existing manufacturing equipment capabilities cover the following production range:

- Medium size sub-assemblies for large civil aircraft
- Large size sub-assemblies for military and regional aircraft
- Small-Medium size static sub-assemblies for military and civil engines
- Kits for modification and upgrade of aircraft and engines

Product Manufacturing capabilities include,

- CAD/CAM & Engineering Analysis (CATIA, UNIGRAPHICS, NASTRAN-PATRAN)
- Material Procurement (MRP)
- Tool Design & Fabrication (EUCLID)
- Machining (up to 5-axis CNC)
- Sheet Metal Forming (Incl. stretch forming)
- Chemical Processing
- Surface Treatments
- Welding (Spot, Seam, Tig, Electro-beam & Dubber Tig Welding)
- Tube Bending
- Assembly
- Packing & Transportation
- Planning & Production Systems Controlling (PRC)
- Manufacturing Engineering
- CNC Programming
- Program Management

=== Engineering and R&D ===
HAI's Research and Development projects are listed below:

- RPV "PEGASUS" Unmanned Aerial Vehicle
- Falcon 900 a/c aft fuselage fuel tank
- Artillery fire control system (computer with gun display terminal)
- Passive night vision scope
- 16 channel military switchboard
- Digital message device
- Surveillance gun periscope
- Wide band encryption

== Collaborations & strategic partners ==
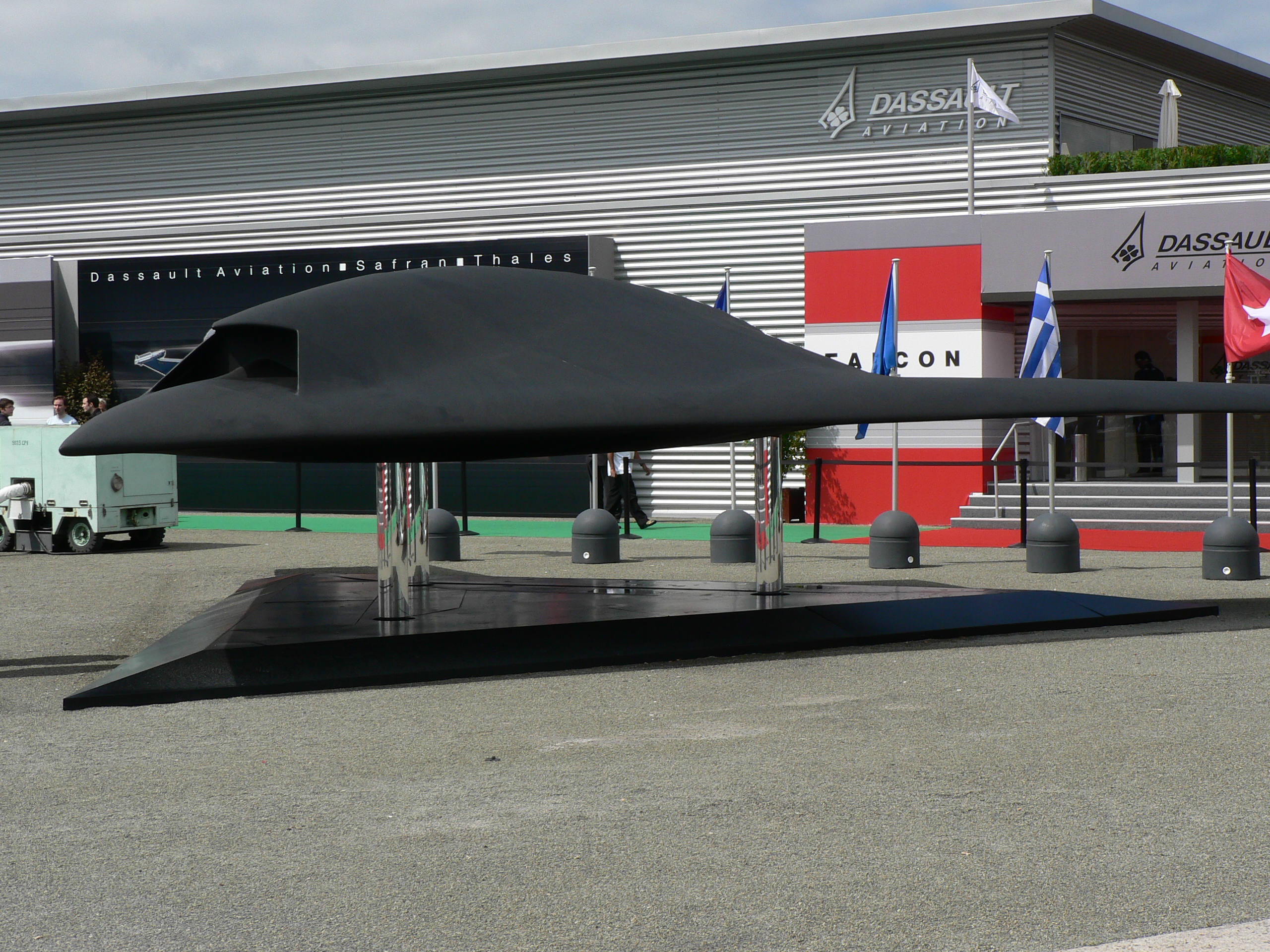
"nEUROn" Next Generation Fighter (full-scale replica) co-produced with Dassault, EADS, Saab AB, RUAG and Alenia

Lockheed Martin has provided valuable assistance both in terms of workload and new technology through the F-16 co-production program and has also invested on HAI’s aerostructures facility expansion to accommodate growth of this program. Lockheed Martin and HAI are exploring the possibility of establishing HAI as a Single Source supplier for a number of F-16 fighter aircraft structural subassemblies.

HAI and Pratt & Whitney have established a joint venture titled "1st Source Aeroengines Services". The mission of this new company will be the MRO of a number of controls and accessories on a variety of commercial and military engines operating worldwide.

HAI operates as one of the world’s six T56 Engine Authorized Maintenance Centers (AMCs) under certification by Rolls-Royce and is also certified as AMC for the C-130 aircraft by Lockheed Martin, for the M53 engine by SNECMA and the T53 engine by Honeywell.

HAI is also a strategic partner with Airbus, Dassault Aviation, EADS, Raytheon, Boeing, SNECMA, Aermacchi and General Electric.

HAI is a partner to the Hellas Sat Consortium S.A. and is participating in a number of European Consortia for the co-production and development of weapon systems, such as IRIS-T, STINGER, ESSM, and the Integrated Eurotraining System (ITS).

== Programs ==
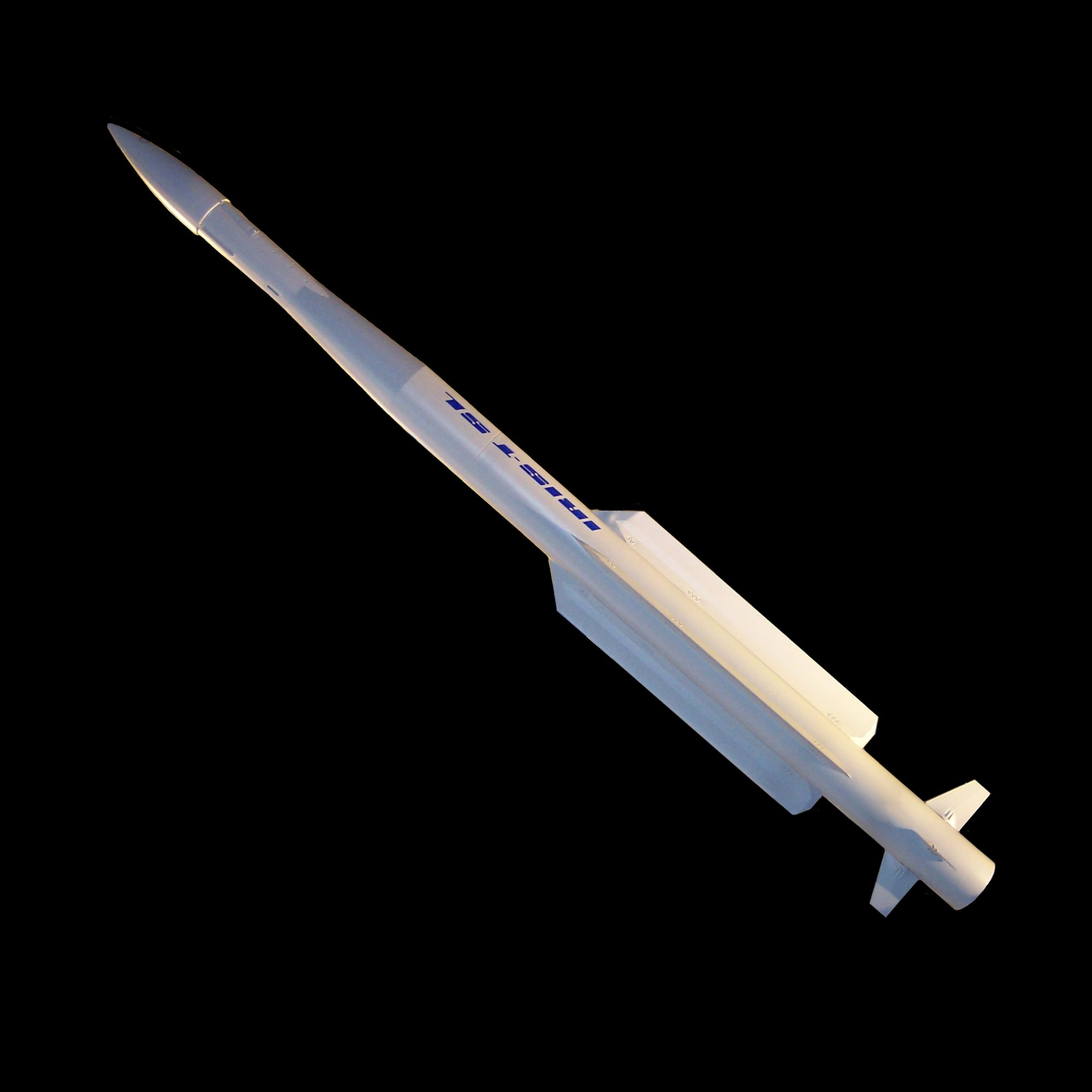
IRIS-T/SL Missile

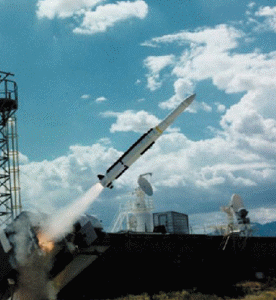
RIM-162 Evolved Sea Sparrow (ESSM)
- IRIS-T (BGT)
- STINGER (EADS-DASA/LFK)
- ESSM (RIM-162 Evolved Sea Sparrow Missile)
- NEXT GENERATION FIGHTER (nEUROn)
- EUROTRAINER (EADS Mako/HEAT)
- GPS GALILEOS
- SPACE PROGRAM "ARTES"
- EU RESEARCH PROGRAMS
- Centauros anti drone system
