= Raab-Katzenstein RK-26 =

1920s German training airplane

RK-26 Tigerschwalbe
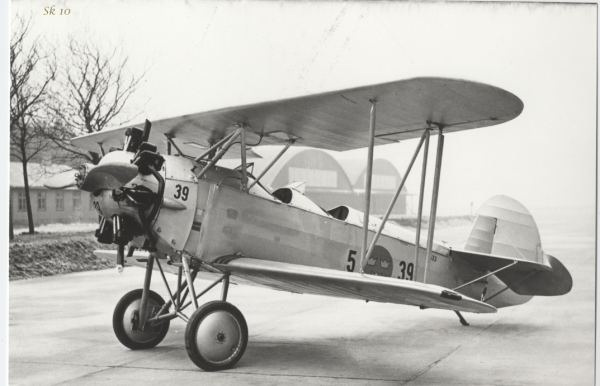

General information
- Type: Training aircraft
- Manufacturer: Raab-Katzenstein; ASJA
- Designer: Gerhard Fieseler
- Status: retired
- Primary users: Swedish Air Force Finnish Air Force
- Number built: Raab-Katzenstein: 2 ASJA: 25

History
- First flight: By the end of the 1920s

Raab-Katzenstein RK-26 Tigerschwalbe, also known as the Fieseler F 1 Tigerschwalbe, was a German twin-seat biplane trainer aircraft designed by Gerhard Fieseler by the end of the 1920s.

== Design and development ==
In December 1930, Fieseler was invited by the Swedish Air Force (Flygvapnet) to present his aircraft for the Swedish aircraft manufacturing company ASJA. Flygvapnet was in need for a new trainer, and the RK-26 was an interesting aircraft. Fieseler had recently won a world aerobatics championship with an RK-26. ASJA then decided to buy one aircraft. It was tested with different engine configurations by Flygvapnet, who later ordered 25 aircraft from ASJA.

== Operational history ==
The trainer was given the designation Sk 10 by Flygvapnet. It was used between 1932 and 1945, but was quite controversial during its active life. This was partly due to changes in the design, which made the aircraft 200 kg heavier than the original, and this changed its flight characteristics drastically. The aircraft was involved in many accidents. Of the 25 delivered aircraft, 18 were written off.

One aircraft, the SE-ADK was purchased in 1934 by a civilian, L. Hemmeringer. When the Winter War began, Hemmeninger donated the aircraft to Finland. The aircraft ended up being used by the Swedish Voluntary Air Force from 9 February 1940. The aircraft was painted in Finnish colors, but was used quite sparingly, due to lack of spares and the bad condition of its engine. Most of the time it was standing at the air force base in Veitsiluoto.

== Surviving craft ==
One Sk 10, the only remaining Tigerschwalbe, is preserved at the Flygvapenmuseum.

== Operators ==
Austria

- Austrian Air Force

Finland

- Finnish Air Force

Sweden

- Swedish Air Force

== Specifications ==
Data from Thulinista Hornetiin

General characteristics

- Crew: 2
- Length: 6.55 m (21 ft 6 in)
- Wingspan: 8.4 m (27 ft 7 in)
- Height: 2.66 m (8 ft 9 in)
- Wing area: 20.2 m^{2} (217 sq ft)
- Empty weight: 782 kg (1,724 lb)
- Gross weight: 1,136 kg (2,504 lb)
- Max takeoff weight: 1,100 kg (2,425 lb)
- Powerplant: 1 × Armstrong Siddeley Lynx 7-cylinder air-cooled radial piston engine, 149–160 kW (200–215 hp)
- Propellers: 2-bladed fixed-pitch propeller

Performance

- Maximum speed: 190 km/h (120 mph, 100 kn)
- Cruise speed: 160 km/h (99 mph, 86 kn)
- Service ceiling: 5,000 m (16,000 ft)

== See also ==
Related lists

- List of military aircraft of Germany
- List of military aircraft of Sweden
