= Blackburn Dart =

1921 torpedo bomber series by Blackburn

T.2 Dart
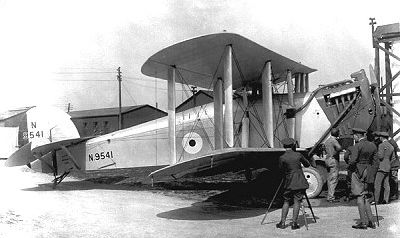
- Blackburn Dart T.2, N9541, 461 Flight, HMS Furious, c. 1930

General information
- Type: Torpedo bomber
- Manufacturer: Blackburn Aircraft
- Primary user: Royal Air Force (Fleet Air Arm)
- Number built: 118 (plus eight Swift export models)

History
- Manufactured: 1922–1928
- Introduction date: 1922
- First flight: October 1921
- Retired: 1933
- Variant: Blackburn Velos

The Blackburn Dart was a carrier-based torpedo bomber biplane aircraft, designed and manufactured by the British aviation company Blackburn Aircraft. It was the standard single-seat torpedo bomber operated by the Fleet Air Arm (FAA) between 1923 and 1933.

Work on what would become the Dart started in 1919 as a private venture. Originally known as the T.1 Swift, it performed its maiden flight in September 1920. Three aircraft were ordered for evaluation to fulfil Air Ministry Specification 3/20, which received the name Dart. First flown in October 1921, its performance quickly impressed officials and a production order was issued to Blackburn on behalf of the FAA. The Swift name was retained for the pursuit of export sales. Several Darts were supplied to overseas operators, including the Imperial Japanese Navy, Spanish Navy and the United States Navy. Greece opted to procure a modified seaplane variant of the aircraft, the Blackburn Velos, which was operated by the Greek Navy as a torpedo bomber.

== Design and development ==
=== Background ===
During late 1919, Blackburn commenced design work on what would become the Dart; it was initially pursued as a private venture. Around this time, the Air Ministry had reissued its requirement for a new carrier-based torpedo-bomber that would replace the Sopwith Cuckoo, the standard torpedo bomber of the era being flown from the aircraft carriers of the Royal Navy. Blackburn's efforts were led by their chief designer, Major Frank Bumpus. Designing was undertaken in close collaboration with the British engineering company D. Napier & Son. This new aircraft was originally named the T.1 Swift.

It was a relatively large single-seat biplane, which was in several respects considered to be a conventional design for the era. It was built around a central nucleus in which the centre fuselage, top centre section, lower wing roots, and undercarriage attachments were one rigid structure composed of steel tubing. This structure provided sufficient strength to withstand the high stresses of carrier operations and carry a heavy concentrated payload, while also being relatively easy to maintain and repair. A similar tubular structure was used for the rear fuselage. The fuselage had an unusual humped appearance due to the decking forward of the pilot sloping sharply downwards to maximise forward visibility over the engine, which was particularly useful during landings.

The Swift had staggered two-bay equal-span wings that could be folded for storage; this arrangement meant Blackburn was the first British company to address the issue of a foldable staggered wing cellule. The centre section of the wing structure was steel, while the outer sections were composed of wood, all of which were covered by fabric. Ailerons were present on all four wings. The tail unit had a braced tailplane and fin with a balanced rudder. The divided landing gear had main wheels on shock absorber (oleo) legs that allowed the fitting of a standard torpedo below the fuselage.

A novelty was the detachable mounting for the engine, which facilitated its replacement as a complete power unit and enabled its swapping in a matter of hours. Another advanced feature was the presence of a fireproof bulkhead between the engine bay and the self-sealing fuel tank in the fuselage, which could accommodate up to 66 imp gal (300 L; 79 US gal) of fuel; a gravity-fed tank housing up to 15 imp gal (68 L; 18 US gal) was present in the centre-top section. It was not necessary to jettison the undercarriage wheels prior to releasing the torpedo, unlike some contemporary aircraft, they were releasable to minimise the tendency for the aircraft to nose over during a forced water landing, for which floatation bags were present in the fuselage. The undercarriage incorporated a triangular support structure, a lengthy support axle, and a rubber compression shock absorber leg. Slings fitted to the top centre section were used to hoist the aircraft aboard ship.

By July 1920, the prototype Swift was sufficiently complete as to permit it to go on be static display to the public at the Olympia Aero Show but without a radiator or controls. The aircraft had already been placed on the British Government's secret list, which meant that it could only be displayed without specialised naval equipment, such as its torpedo release apparatus. The torpedo had to be placed on the ground between the undercarriage rather than being placed in its operational position.

=== Flight testing ===
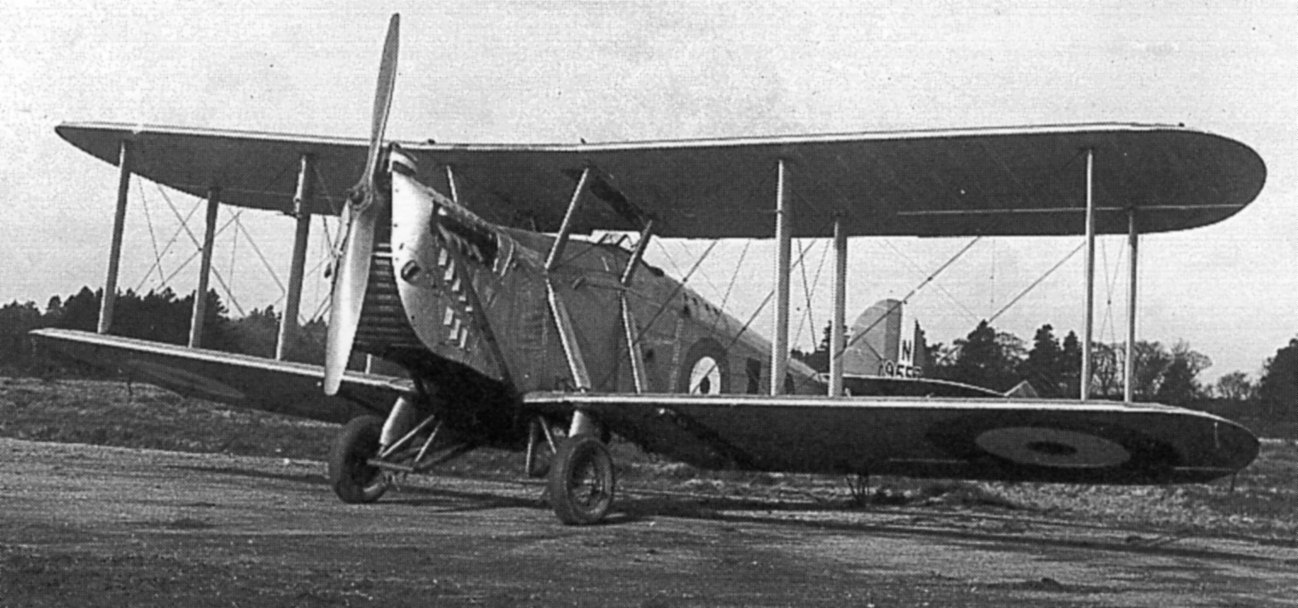
A Dart at RAF Martlesham Heath, circa 1925

During September 1920, the prototype Swift conducted its maiden flight; it reportedly almost crashed during the flight on account of its miscalculated centre of gravity. This problem was solved by sweeping back the wings. Following this modification, the Swift proved largely satisfactory in flight; on 23 December 1920, it was brought to RAF Martlesham Heath for performance trials by the Aeroplane and Armament Experimental Establishment. One requested change, made in January 1921, was the fitting of an enlarged rudder to improve directional control. By 20 April, the trials had been completed.

On 9 May 1921, following the installation of a new engine, a stiffened cowling, and arrestor claws on the stub axles, the prototype was dispatched to Gosport. Shortly thereafter, the type's first deck landing was performed by the Canadian pilot Gerald Boyce onboard HMS Argus. Having suitably impressed officials, Blackburn received an order for three aircraft to conduct service trials as per Air Ministry Specification 3/20. These aircraft, which were equipped to Admiralty requirements, received the name Dart.

The Dart had its wingspan reduced by 2 ft 11 in (0.89 m), which brought the twin tips closer to the outboard interplane struts, was the most visually distinctive change. Other modifications included the adoption of more powerful engines, either a Napier Lion IIB or V engine that was mounted with a thrust line angled upward. The claw arrestor gear that had been fitted experimentally to the Swift prototype was also fitted as standard.

During October 1921, the prototype Dart performed its first flight; on 24 October, it was flown from Brough to RAF Martlesham for performance testing. It reportedly handled well, in spite of its size and exhibited a remarkable stalling speed of only 43 mph (69 km/h). The first prototype also participated in deck handling trials aboard Argus. The second and third prototypes underwent various evaluations, most of which were performed at Martlesham. A series of competitive trials against the Handley Page Hanley were conducted at Gosport, during which the Dart emerged as the victor and became the new standard torpedo bomber of the Fleet Air Arm. An initial production contract for 26 aircraft was issued to Blackburn.

During March 1922, deliveries commenced, having been built at Blackburn's Olympia Works and tested at Brough. Three additional batches of ten Darts each were produced between 1923 and 1924; a larger contract for 32 aircraft was issued in August 1924. As late as November 1926, more small orders for replacement aircraft were also received. Production to the Dart came to a close during 1928, by when, 117 aircraft had been produced for the FAA.

An export model of the Dart retained the Swift name. This was powered by the Napier Lion engine, capable of producing up to 450 hp (340 kW). The aircraft's ability to carry up to 1,500 lb (680 kg) of bombs or an 18 in (460 mm) torpedo was attractive to international operators. Seven aircraft were built as the Swift Mk II, two for the Japanese Navy, three for the Spanish Navy and two for the United States Navy. The U.S. Navy aircraft were designated Swift F by Blackburn and Blackburn BST-1 by the U.S. Navy; following competitive trials held during 1921, the U.S. Navy chose the Douglas DT-2 instead. The aircraft were retained in San Diego for a time, being used for experimental purposes.

== Operational history ==
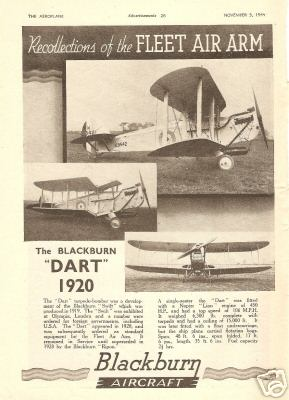
Blackburn company advertisement announcing the Blackburn Dart (note the erroneous 1920 date)

During 1923, the Dart T.2 entered service with the Fleet Air Arm (FAA). The first units to receive the type were No 460 Flight aboard HMS Eagle stationed in the Mediterranean and with 461 and 462 Flights on HMS Furious based in home waters. Shore training was conducted by "D3" Flight at Gosport. According to the aviation author Audrey Jackson, the Dart played an important role in the FAA's development and perfection of techniques for torpedo-bombing.

During 1928, the Blackburn Dart flew with Nos. 463 and 464 Flights embarked on HMS Courageous in the Mediterranean fleet. The following year, a Dart was delivered to 36 Squadron (Coastal Defence Torpedo Flight) RAF, initially for smokescreen trials and later to form part of the complement of torpedo bombers in the first fully operational torpedo bomber squadron of the Royal Air Force.

Three Darts were converted into two-seat seaplanes to provide advanced training at Blackburn's RAF Reserve School on the River Humber between 1925 and 1929. These conversions led to a new variant, the T.3 Velos, which was procured by Greece in 1925 for use as a torpedo bomber by the Greek Navy.

The Dart continued in service with the Blackburn Reserve School, alongside a number of T.3s converted to landplanes, until their eventual replacement by the Blackburn Ripon and Blackburn Baffin during 1933.

Perhaps the most notable event in the career of the Dart occurred on 6 May 1926 when Air Commodore G. H. Boyce became the first pilot to carry out a night deck landing, alighting his Dart aboard Furious. The flight deck was illuminated by floodlights for the attempt but the docile Dart reportedly handled the task with ease. Within a few years, night time flights from aircraft carriers would become a routine operation.

== Variants ==
T.1 Swift
Prototype torpedo bomber, one built.
Dart
Prototype; one built.
T.2 Dart
Initial production variant – 117 built (three converted to two-seat trainers).
Swift Mk II
Export version – seven built.
Swift F
US Navy designation of the Swift Mk II for evaluation (would have been designated the BST-1 if ordered).
T.3 Velos
Two-seat variant for the Greek Navy – 16 built (12 under licence in Greece).
T.3A Velos
Company demonstrator and trial aircraft – six built.

== Operators ==
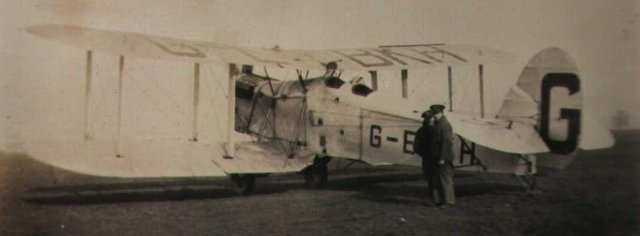
A Dart trainer

Japan

- Imperial Japanese Navy (as Swift Mk II)

Spain

- Spanish Navy (as Swift Mk II)

United Kingdom

- North Sea Aerial & General Transport Company (as T.3A Velos)
- Royal Air Force (Fleet Air Arm)

United States

- United States Navy (as Swift F)

== Specifications (Dart T.2) ==
Data from Jane's Encyclopedia of Aviation, Blackburn Aircraft since 1909

General characteristics

- Crew: 1
- Length: 35 ft 4 1/2 in (10.782 m)
- Wingspan: 45 ft 5 3/4 in (13.862 m)
- Height: 12 ft 11 in (3.94 m)
- Wing area: 654 sq ft (60.8 m^{2})
- Empty weight: 3,599 lb (1,632 kg)
- Gross weight: 6,383 lb (2,895 kg)
- Powerplant: 1 × Napier Lion IIB W-12 water-cooled piston engine, 450 hp (340 kW)

or 465 hp (347 kW) Lion V

- Propellers: 2-bladed fixed-pitch propeller

Performance

- Maximum speed: 107 mph (172 km/h, 93 kn) with dummy torpedo at 3,000 ft (914 m)
- Cruise speed: 100 mph (160 km/h, 87 kn)
- Stall speed: 43.5 mph (70.0 km/h, 37.8 kn)
- Range: 410 mi (660 km, 360 nmi)
- Service ceiling: 12,700 ft (3,900 m)
- Rate of climb: 600 ft/min (3.0 m/s)

Armament

- Guns: 1 × fixed, forward firing Vickers machine gun (not Mk II) and 1 × Lewis gun in rear cockpit.
- Bombs: 1 × Mark VIII or IX, 18 in (457 mm) torpedo or up to 2 × 520 lb (236 kg) bombs under each wing.

== See also ==
- Sempill Mission

Related development

- Blackburn Baffin
