= Centauros anti drone system =

Hellenic Aerospace Industry military equipment

Centauros anti drone system or Centaur counter UAV system, developed by Hellenic Aerospace Industry (HAI), is a Greek anti drone system (counter-unmanned aerial system, C-UAS). This system is noted being the first combat proven system manufactured in Europe, distinguished record in countering unmanned aerial vehicle (UAV) threats, particularly in naval operations in the Red Sea during 2024–2025. For Class 1 drones, the smaller Iperion system can be utilised.

== Name origin ==
The name of the system originate from the mythological Centaur, a half-man, half-horse creature.

== Background and development ==
The Centauros anti drone system was developed to neutralize various growing threats from drones used for spying or as weapons against military and commercial targets. It was designed and built by Greece's Hellenic Aerospace Industry to protect important facilities from low, slow, and hard to spot aerial threats. While presented as a domestic development, some defense analysts have noted technical similarities between the Centauros and the Ukrainian Bukovel-AD, suggesting the system may be based on or produced under license from Ukrainian technology. Its development was sped up as part of Greece’s €30 billion military upgrade program, planned to finish by 2036.

== Design and features ==
The Centauros anti drone system main feature is its ability to send from far away jamming signals aimed at specific frequencies while moving, unlike older jamming systems. It includes:

=== Long range passive detection ===
Has the capability to detect UAVs at distances up to 150km (93mi).

=== Automated tracking ===
Continuously and automatically tracks multiple aerial targets.

=== Electronic jamming ===
Neutralizes drones through targeted, high-power radio-frequency jamming, designed to disrupt the drone's control, guidance, and navigation systems. The jammer focuses all energy on the frequency in use by the hostile UAV, maximizing efficiency and efficacy.

=== Operational flexibility ===
Even though it was designed primarily for naval use, the system is adaptable to ground vehicles or stationary defense.

=== Engagement range ===
Effective jamming and neutralizing targets at ranges of up to 25km (15.5mi).

== Operational history ==
Centauros was placed on Greek Navy Hydra-class (MEKO 200HN) frigates, including the ship Psara. It was sent on missions as part of the European Union’s effort to keep the Red Sea safe for trade and travel. In 2024 and 2025, Centauros proved itself in real combat. It has been used in combat in the Red Sea by the Hellenic Navy frigate Psara. The CENTAUR can detect and jam multiple drones of NATO Class 2 and 3, up to 150 km away. It was able to spot, block, and disable enemy drones launched by Yemen’s Houthi movement. By doing this, it protected both commercial shipping routes and allied naval ships, and it did so without wasting expensive missiles or ammunition.

On its very first mission, Centauros showed how effective it could be. It forced two enemy drones to crash or be taken out of action, and it drove away two more by cutting off their control signals. This early success in live battle gave Centauros a strong reputation. As a result, Greece decided to equip more of its navy ships with the system, making it a key part of their defense strategy at sea.

During the 2026 Iran War, following drone attacks on Cyprus, Greece sent four F-16 fighter jets and two frigates, including one carrying the Centauros anti-drone jamming system.

== Cost ==
At a cost of two million euros per system, the CENTAUR can knock down enemy drones without kinetic interceptors, to conserve missile stockpiles. One RIM-162 ESSM surface-to-air missile can cost the same amount as one CENTAUR, and one frigate can only carry sixteen of these missiles.

== Operators ==
=== Current operators ===
- Greece
- Cyprus
- Bulgaria

== See also ==
- Hellenic Armed Forces
- Hellenic army
- Hellenic Republic / Ministry of National Defense
