= AEKKEA-RAAB R-29 =

1936 Greek trainer plane

AEKKEA-Raab R-29

General information
- Type: Trainer or Fighter/Trainer
- National origin: Kingdom of Greece
- Manufacturer: AEKKEA-RAAB
- Designer: Design office headed by Georgios Pangagis
- Primary users: Spanish Republican Air Force Royal Hellenic Air Force (intended)
- Number built: unknown (30 planned)

History
- First flight: 1936

The AEKKEA-RAAB R-29 was a Greek single-seat parasol monoplane trainer and/or light fighter developed by AEKKEA-RAAB, a company created by Antonius Raab, a German aircraft builder, with his Greek partners and was one of the Raab-type aircraft developed in Greece.

== Design and development ==
The airplane had wooden wings and an Elektron (alloy) metal-tube fuselage. However, there is no exact record for produced numbers. The R-29 was a new design developed by Raab's Greek company in late 1936, when its design office was headed by Georgios Pangakis, but shared structural characteristics with the preceding R-27 type (a type also first recorded as an AEKKEA-RAAB product by Jane's 1935 ed., most probably designed by a previous Raab company and never produced), which featured an inline Hispano-Suiza 12Y engine, retractable undercarriage and twin machine-guns.

Export documents to Spain and Jane's (1936 ed.) reported it as a fighter, but Raab later described it as a trainer, which would be borne out by the low powered engine chosen. A batch of these aircraft, along with the Tigerschwalbe R-26V/33 (derived from an earlier Raab-Katzenstein model), were to be delivered to the Republican forces. Components of 20 aircraft were to be produced in Greece and shipped to Spain, where a subsidiary would carry out final assembly. The head of the AEKKEA design office, Georgios Pangakis, reported 40 (rather than 20) R-29s shipped to Spain, still missing engines and machine guns, which proved difficult to acquire. According to Raab, the Republicans gave roughly 60 incomplete airframes of both types, along with plans to the Soviets to be shipped back to the USSR.

The AEKKEA archives were destroyed and there seems to be no surviving images and only the contemporary Jane's provides a written description.

== Specifications ==
Data from

General characteristics

- Crew: 1
- Propellers: 2-bladed variable-pitch propeller

Performance

- Maximum speed: 473 km/h (294 mph, 255 kn)

Armament

- Guns: 2 × machine guns

== See also ==
Aircraft of comparable role, configuration, and era

- PZL P.24
- Gloster Gladiator

Related lists

- List of aircraft of World War II
