= HAI Pegasus =

Greek indigenous medium-altitude long-endurance Unmanned Aerial Vehicle

E1-79 Pegasus
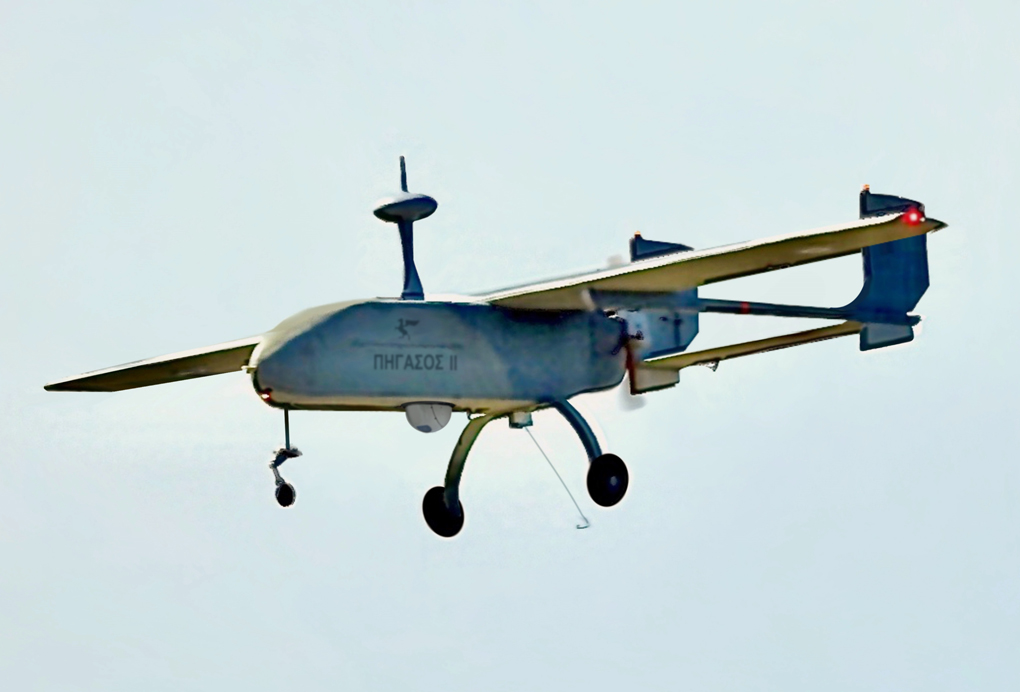
- HAI E1-79 Pegasus II

General information
- Type: Surveillance and Reconnaissance
- National origin: Greece
- Manufacturer: Hellenic Aerospace Industry
- Designer: Air Force Research and Development Center (KETA)
- Status: 4 aircraft in active service
- Primary user: Hellenic Air Force
- Number built: 16 (Est.)

History
- Manufactured: 1992 - 2007
- Introduction date: 1992 - Pegasus; 2005 - Pegasus II
- First flight: 1982

The HAI Ε1-79 Pegasus (Greek: ΕΑΒ Ε1-79 Πήγασος) is a Greek indigenous medium-altitude long-endurance Unmanned Aerial Vehicle (MALE - UAV) produced by the Hellenic Aerospace Industry (HAI/EAB). It entered service with the Hellenic Air Force as Pegasus in 1992, and as the upgraded version Pegasus II in 2005. Its main mission is Intelligence Surveillance & Reconnaissance over-battlefield (ISR-OB).

== Design and development ==
Development on the Pegasus was handled jointly between the Hellenic Air Force Research and Development Center (KETA) and HAI, and began in 1979 with the maiden flight in prototype form in 1982.

The Pegasus is conventional by Unmanned Aerial System (UAS) standards, incorporating a twin-boom, pusher-prop engine along with a slab-sided fuselage and high-mounted wings. The twin booms emanate from the trailing edge of each mainplane and are capped at the rear by vertical tailplanes, joined together by a shared horizontal plane. The undercarriage is of a tricycle non-retractable type and the aircraft is wheeled for take-off. Over the fuselage is a protruding component, seating a disc-shaped telecommunications antenna. A trainable turret is seen under the fuselage housing sensors and camera equipment.

=== E1-79 Pegasus ===
The first generation Pegasus had a length of 2.1 meters (6.9 feet), wingspan of 5 meters (16.4 feet), maximum speed 160 km/h (100 miles-per-hour), minimum speed 75 km/h, takeoff load of 130 kilograms and autonomy of 3.5 hours. Ten units including the ground station infrastructure were produced by Hellenic Aerospace, and a number of them by KEA to facilitate its performance optimization. It became operational by 1992.

=== E1-79 Pegasus II ===
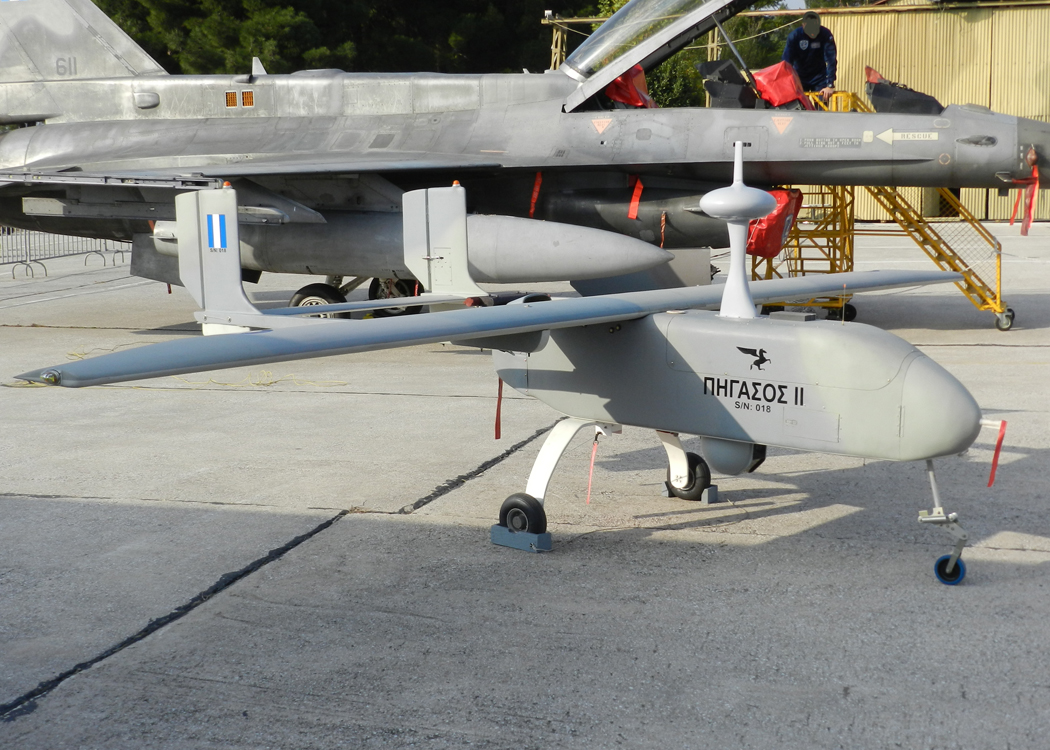
HAI E1-79 Pegasus II displayed at Larissa AFB, Greece.

The upgraded MALE design named Pegasus II (Block I), was introduced in 2005. It featured advanced electronics, an increased fuselage length of 4.3 meters (14.1 feet), increased wingspan 6.2 meters (20.34 feet), takeoff load of 250 kg (551 lb) and increased autonomy of 15 hours. From the 16 units initially produced by the State Aircraft Factory (KEA) and HAI between 2005 and 2007, four units remain operational including the ground stations and equipment. Pegasus II can carry a maximum payload weight of 50 kg and thanks to the wide use of composite materials for its construction, it represents a substantial improvement from the initial design. Its technical features make it suitable for ISR-OB missions and it is evaluated as an ELINT payload carrier. Expectations for its use as a weapons carrier were limited, as the relatively small payload capacity makes it less suitable for these types of missions.

== Operators ==
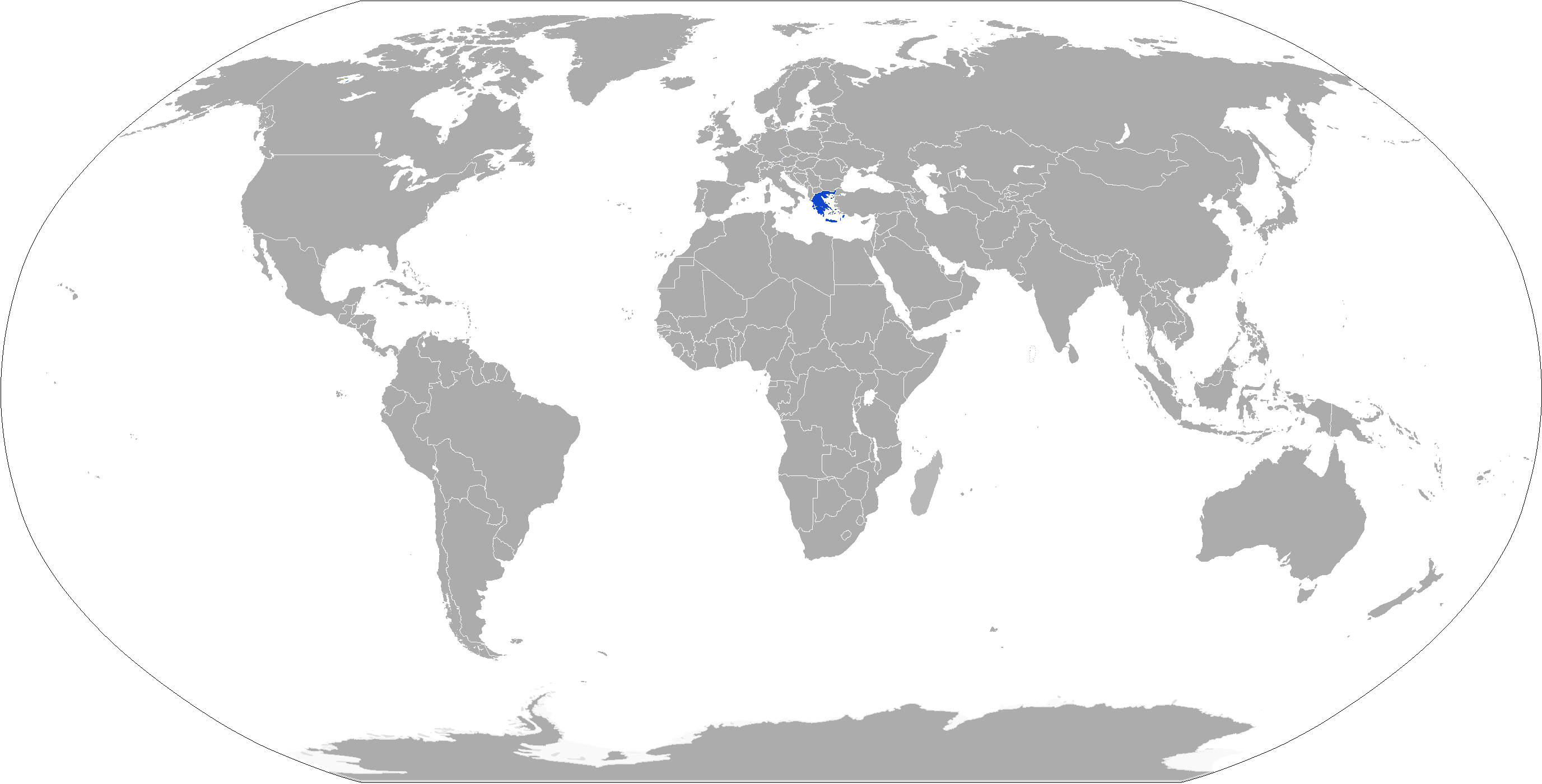
HAI Pegasus II UAV operators in blue

Greece

- The Hellenic Air Force operates four units with the HAF Unmanned Aircraft Squadron "Acheron" of the 110 Fighter Wing in Larissa, Greece.
