= KEA Chelidon =

First airplane by Greek EAF

Chelidon
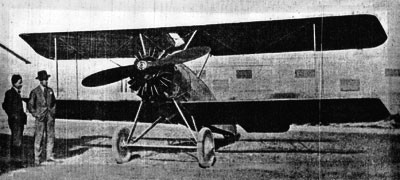

General information
- Type: training and Reconnaissance
- Manufacturer: EAF (KEA)
- Designer: Team supervised by Charles H. Lowe-Wylde
- Number built: 1 (original order for 18 aircraft)

History
- Manufactured: 1927
- First flight: 20 February 1927
- Retired: 1938

The Chelidon (Greek: Χελιδών, /çe.liˈðon/, meaning 'Swallow') was the first airplane developed by the Greek EAF (KEA) aircraft factory with management provided by Blackburn Aircraft Limited at the time. As mentioned in the contemporary Jane's edition, it was designed by Greeks (under the supervision of Mr. Charles H. Lowe-Wylde), according to Greek Navy specifications. The development of the Chelidon was completed in the virtually record time of eight weeks, and the first flight was made on 20 February 1927, as a two-seater military biplane designed for advanced training and other roles including reconnaissance and could also be transformed into a hydroplane. Powered by a 120 hp (89 kW) Salmson 9AC engine, (future variants were to use the Armstrong Siddeley Lynx engine), and had a maximum speed of 150 km/h (93 mph; 81 kn).

An order was originally placed in December 1926, by the Greek Navy, for 18 aircraft but no further production followed, as, after the three-month test flight period, it was considered inferior to alternative proposed models. The example built was used for technical personnel training at KEA and was probably scrapped in 1938.

== Specifications (Chelidon) ==
Data from KEA Chelidon

General characteristics

- Crew: 2
- Length: 5.79 m (19 ft 0 in)
- Wingspan: 8.17 m (26 ft 10 in)
- Powerplant: 1 × Salmson 9AC 9-cylinder air-cooled radial piston engine, 89 kW (120 hp)
- Propellers: 2-bladed fixed pitch propeller

Performance

- Maximum speed: 150 km/h (93 mph, 81 kn)
