= AEKKEA-RAAB =

- Company type: public limited company
- Founded: 1935
- Founder: Antonius Raab, Apostolos Agnidis, Konstantinos Bitzios and Georgios Sarigiannis,
- Defunct: 1951
- Headquarters: (1935-1936 Piraeus) (1937 Phaleron), Kingdom of Greece
- Owner: Antonius Raab

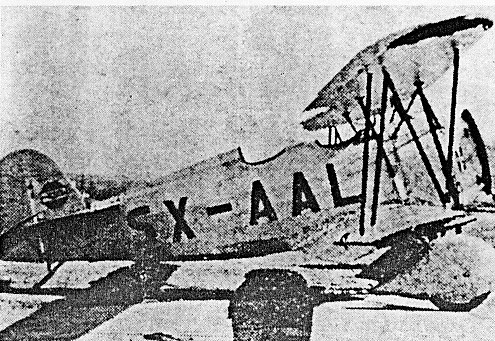
AEKKEA-RAAB Schwalbe II (temporary registration)

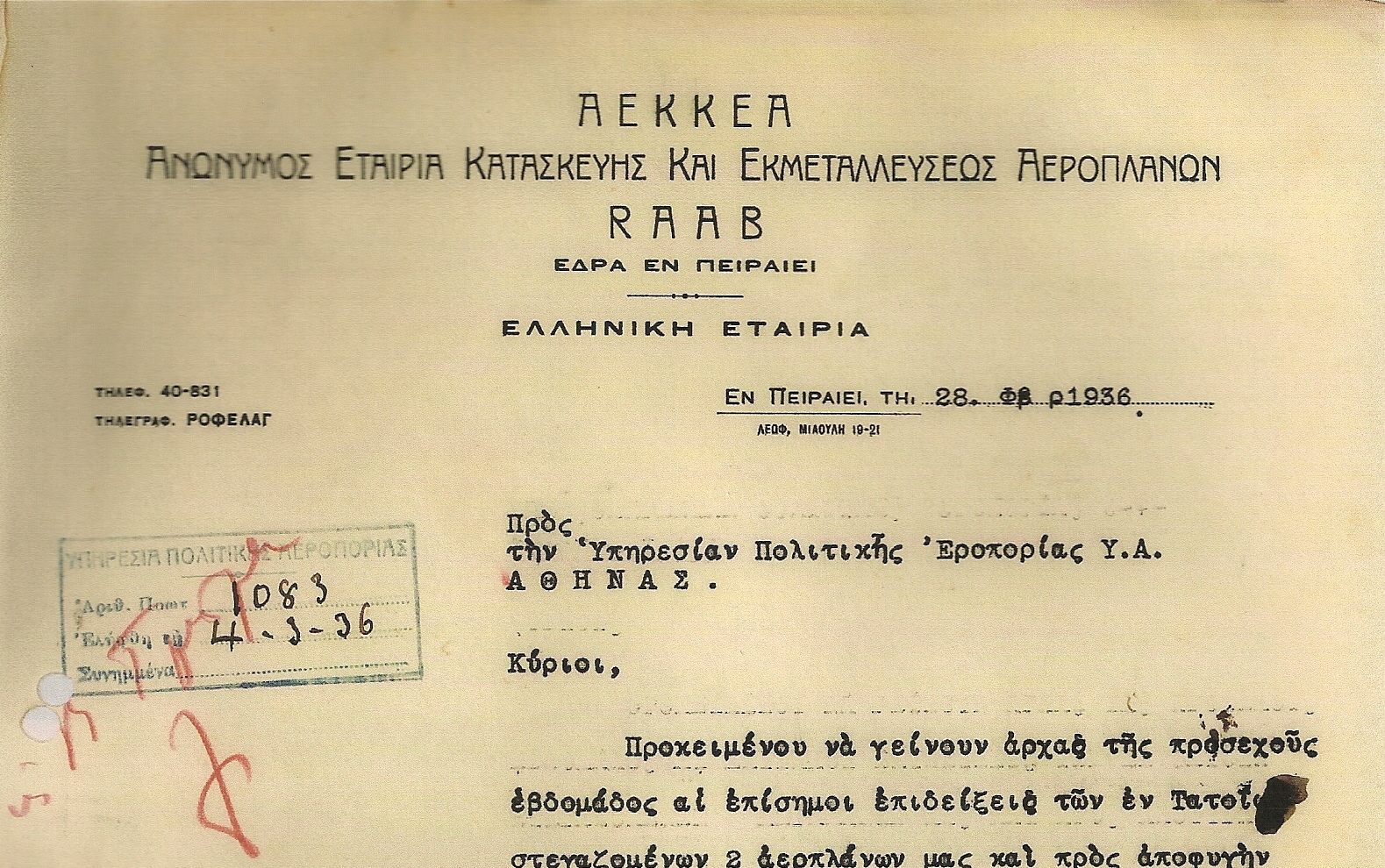
Top part of a 1936 AEKKEA-RAAB company letter addressed to the Greek Civil Aviation Authority. Company headquarters and other details can be seen (Michalis Pararas archive).

The history of AEKKEA (Anonymos Etaireia Kataskevis Kai Ekmetallefseos Aeroplanon - Societe Anonyme Pour la Fabrication et l'Exploitation des Avions Raab), an aircraft maker based in Greece, is connected with the history of a distinguished German aircraft builder, Antonius Raab (his first name alternatively known as Antonios, in Greek, and Antonio, in Spanish after his involvement in Spain).

== Establishment ==
In Germany, Raab was the co-founder of Raab-Katzenstein, an aircraft manufacturing company. A devoted anti-Nazi, Raab was forced out of his homeland, and after attempts to establish his company in Estonia and Latvia, ended up in 1935 in Greece, where he had the support of a high-ranking Air Force officer (Gen. Panagiotis Gazis). With this support, he and his Greek partners founded a company called AEKKEA (which stood for "Anonymos Etaireia Kataskevis Kai Ekmetallefseos Aeroplanon", or, in French, the "international" language employed in Greece at the time "Societe Anonyme Pour la Fabrication et l'Exploitation des Avions Raab"). The company was legally established on October 20, 1935, by Antonius Raab, Apostolos Agnidis, Konstantinos Bitzios and Georgios Sarigiannis, with headquarters in Piraeus (to be moved it in 1937 to nearby Phaleron). Construction was undertaken by Pyrkal defence industry until AEKKEA's own factory in Moschato started operation in 1937.

== Original activities ==
The company employed Greek staff (including management and engineers like Greece's best known aircraft engineer, Georgios Pangakis, who became director of the company's design office), but a number of German technicians had also followed Raab to Greece. Its first reported types (to be produced) were - or were related to - models from Raab’s previous company, including the Pelikan trainer and touring plane, the R-27 single-seat fighter, the Schwalbe (I/II) and the Tigerschwalbe IV multi-role military aircraft. The first company "construction" was actually an old Raab-Katzenstein Schwalbe Kl 1c upgraded to Schwalbe II, and at least one complete Schwalbe II was also constructed. Except for the Schwalbe, and, possibly, a Pelikan, no production is verified for any other of the particular types; the company nonetheless possessed the designs and production rights. The first "job" of the new company was an order from Austria for two Schwalbe and two Tigerschwalbe, which were built under licence by Pintsch in Vienna. No further Austrian orders were made, under German pressure. At least one Schwalbe II was active with the Austrian Air Force when that country was annexed by Germany. The Turkish government had also at some point expressed interest in the Schwalbe.

== Development and production of new aircraft types; sales to Spain ==
In 1936, Raab's design division in the Greek company designed some new types, such as the R-29 and Tigerschwalbe R-26V/33 military aircraft, and the R-52 bomber and transport plane. Of those, the first two were to be produced for the Republican forces in the Spanish Civil War, which Raab supported, while the third probably remained a design. Raab had to deal with the complications of supplies to Spain in that period (non-intervention treaty); a commercial office of the Greek company was set up in Paris, while a subsidiary was created in Spain. The main and more complex parts and equipment of the aircraft were built in Athens (parts of the construction were undertaken by Pyrkal, while KEA equipment were also used) and shipped to Spain. Residents of Moschato described seeing truckloads of aircraft parts leaving the factory, obviously heading to ships destined for Spain, while others complained for the continuous noise made during testing of aircraft engines in the factory. Once in Spain, the local subsidiary undertook assembly and fitting of certain parts, in a former textile factory in Sabadell under Raab's supervision (according to some reports, a number of planes were shipped from Greece almost completely finished, the only remaining step being fitting of engines and machine guns). According to Raab, a total of 60 (i.e., 30 of each type) aircraft were almost finished, when they were shipped, along with the construction plans, to the USSR. Raab was arrested as a "German spy", but managed to escape and returned to Greece in 1938.

== Activities immediately before WWII and company dissolution ==
AEKKEA produced dozens of gliders on modified German designs (Gruene Post, Grunau Baby and Zoegling types, sold and used locally), as well as a large number of spare parts for other aircraft and a variety of specialized equipment for the Greek armed forces, some exports also being made. A proposal to sell aircraft to the Greek Air Force was rejected, as the AEKKEA types were considered "not up to the desired standards". This rejection, however, was probably more connected to politics than technology. Nonetheless, one aircraft (probably a Schwalbe) was being built for a Greek customer when the country was invaded by the Germans and the factory ceased operations, and could be seen, unfinished, in the site of the factory for years after the end of the war. During the German invasion, Raab escaped the country and eventually ended up in India, where he set up a short-lived aircraft factory (it built 2 gliders).

In 1948, he was deported to Europe, living in Germany and Italy until 1985. AEKKEA was formally dissolved in 1951.

== Aircraft of AEKKEA ==
- AEKKEA-RAAB R-52 (1936 twin-engined bomber and/or transport) (Project)
- AEKKEA-RAAB R-33 Tigerschwalbe (1936 trainer/light-fighter) (Project)
- AEKKEA-RAAB R-29 (1936 single-seat parasol monoplane trainer and/or light-fighter)
- AEKKEA-RAAB R-28 (high-wing cantilever monoplane light-fighter)
- AEKKEA-RAAB R-27 (1935 low-wing monoplane fighter derived from Raab-Katzenstein RK-25)
- AEKKEA-RAAB R-26V (1937 two-seat trainer/light-fighter)
- AEKKEA-RAAB R-1C Schwalbe II (1935 two-seat tandem biplane trainer)

== Bibliography ==
- L.S. Skartsis and G.A. Avramidis, "Made in Greece", Typorama, Patras, Greece (2003).
- L.S. Skartsis, "Greek Vehicle & Machine Manufacturers 1800 to present: A Pictorial History", Marathon (2012) ISBN 978-960-93-4452-4 (eBook)
- Jane’s "All the World’s Aircraft" (1936-1937 ed.)
- Antonius Raab, "Raab Fliegt (Erinnerungen eines Flugpioniers)", Reihe Konkret, Hamburg (1984).
- Greek Civil Aviation Authority Archives
- "Oikonomikos Tachydromos" magazine, October 20, 1935, issue (AEKKEA establishment)
