= Blackburn Velos =

Velos
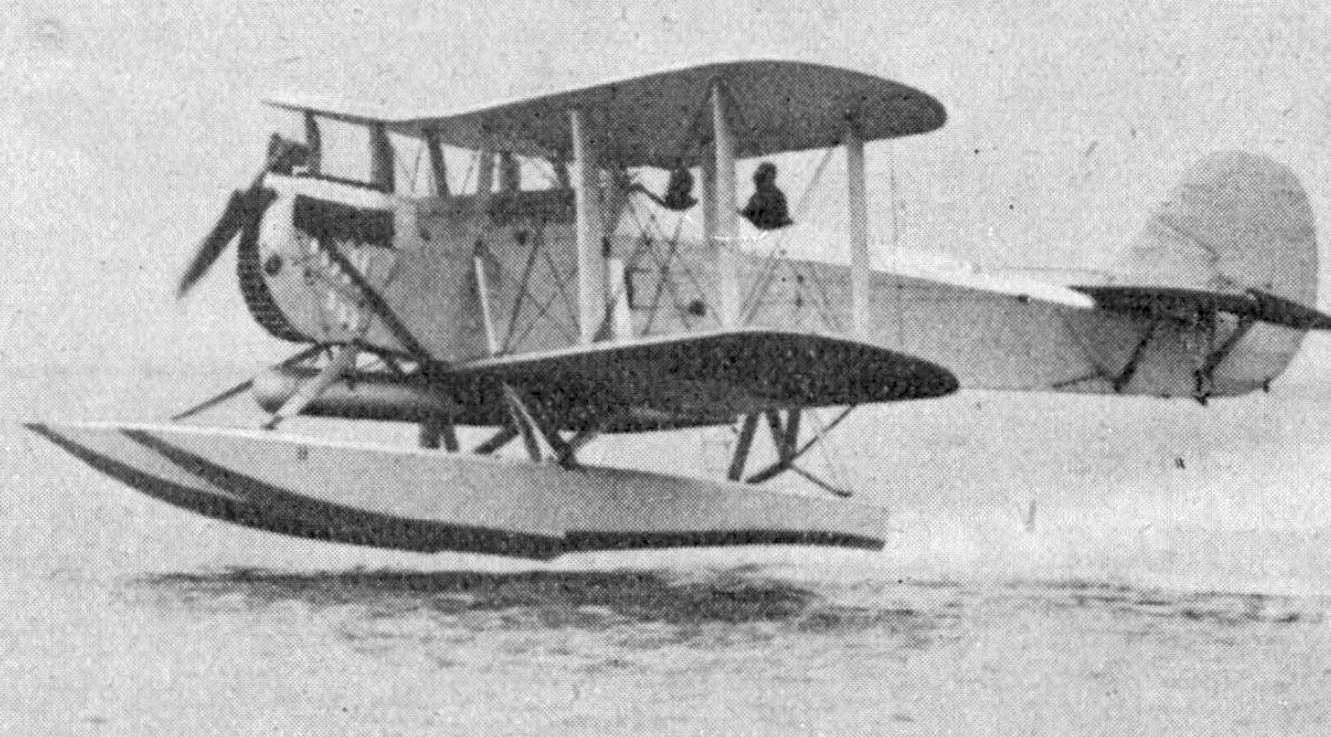

General information
- Type: Coastal defence seaplane
- Manufacturer: Blackburn Aeroplane & Motor Company Limited, Greek National Aircraft Factory (KEA)
- Primary users: Greek Navy North Sea Aerial and General Transport Company Limited
- Number built: 22

History
- First flight: 1925
- Retired: 1936
- Developed from: Blackburn T.2 Dart

The Blackburn T.3 Velos was a 1920s British two-seat coastal defence seaplane designed by Blackburn Aeroplane & Motor Company Limited, Brough Aerodrome and constructed by the Greek National Aircraft Factory.

== Design and development ==
The basic design of the Blackburn Dart was developed into a two-seater to meet a Greek Navy requirement for a coastal defence seaplane. The aircraft became the T.3 Velos, a twin-float seaplane. The Velos differed from the standard Dart T.2 in having a two-seat cockpit with a rear-mounted .303 in (7.7 mm) Lewis Gun, an increased weapons load with four 230 lb (104 kg) bombs mounted under the wings and provisions to fly as either a seaplane with floats or with a conventional undercarriage.

In 1925, a small batch of four aircraft was built at Brough Aerodrome for the Greek Navy. Later in the same year, the aircraft was chosen to be the first licence-built aircraft in Greece, in a factory built by Blackburn and operated under a five-year contract. The Aircraft Factory, later renamed the State Aircraft Factory or Greek National Aircraft Factory, operated in Palaion Faliro to produce 12 Greek-built T.3A Velos aircraft with a raised rear cockpit to give an improved field of fire for the observer and a larger radiator. The first, 450 hp Napier Lion engine-variant, of the production order was launched and tested in March 1926, taking off Phaleron Bay and piloted by Col. William Forbes-Sempill.

Blackburn produced two additional T.3 models as the T.3A Velos, initially for trials of the company's new metal floats and later, one example embarked on a demonstration and sales tour of South America in 1927. Despite the sales tour, the T.3A garnered no orders. Both T.3As were converted to seaplane trainers and joined four other production aircraft built for the Blackburn Reserve School (North Sea Aerial and General Transport Co. Ltd) to replace the company's Dart seaplane trainers for providing advanced training. After 1929, all of the T.3As were converted back into landplanes and continued in service until replacement by Ripons and Baffins in 1933.

== Operational service ==
The Blackburn T.3 Velos not only fulfilled an operational role as a coastal defence/torpedo bomber in the Naval Air Component Squadrons in Greece, but also helped establish an indigenous aviation industry. The aircraft began operations in 1926 with the Greek Navy deployed at Tatoi Aerodrome and Phaleron Bay, Athens. During operations, the T.3s delivered steady if not spectacular service. The Velos remained in squadron use until 1934 with all examples retired by 1936.

== Operators ==
=== Civil operators ===
United Kingdom

- North Sea Aerial and General Transport Company Limited

=== Military operators ===
Greece

- Hellenic Air Force
- Hellenic Navy

== Specifications (T.3A Velos Landplane) ==
Data from Blackburn Aircraft since 1909

General characteristics

- Crew: 3
- Length: 35 ft 6 in (10.82 m)
- Wingspan: 48 ft 6 in (14.78 m)
- Height: 12 ft 3 in (3.73 m)
- Wing area: 654 sq ft (60.8 m^{2})
- Empty weight: 3,765 lb (1,708 kg)
- Gross weight: 6,370 lb (2,889 kg)
- Powerplant: 1 × Napier Lion IIB or V W-12 water-cooled piston engine, 450 hp (340 kW)
- Propellers: 2-bladed fixed-pitch propeller

Performance

- Maximum speed: 107 mph (172 km/h, 93 kn)
- Cruise speed: 71 mph (114 km/h, 62 kn)
- Endurance: 4 hours 30 minutes
- Service ceiling: 13,400 ft (4,100 m)
- Rate of climb: 620 ft/min (3.1 m/s)
- Wing loading: 9.74 lb/sq ft (47.6 kg/m^{2})
- Power/mass: 0.071 hp/lb (0.117 kW/kg)

Armament

- Guns: 1 × .303 in (7.7 mm) Lewis gun
- Bombs: 1 × 18 in (457 mm) torpedo or 4 × 230 lb (104 kg) bombs.

== See also ==
Related development

- Blackburn Dart
