= Hellenic Air Force Aircraft Depot =

- Active: 1925
- Country: Greece
- Branch: Hellenic Air Force
- Role: aircraft maintenance depot
- Motto: Greek: Mοχθείν ανάγκη ευτυχείν
- Website: https://www.haf.gr/en/structure/hafsc/haf-aircraft-depot/

The State Aircraft Factory of Greece, official name Hellenic Air Force Aircraft Depot, usually known through the acronym KEA (Greek: Κρατικό Εργοστάσιο Αεροπλάνων), originally founded as EAF (Εργοστάσιο Αεροπλάνων Φαλήρου, "Phaliron Aircraft Factory"), is the oldest and most historic Greek aircraft manufacturer. It is a military unit subordinate to the Hellenic Air Force Support Command (HAFSC) and since 2012 it is located at Elefsis Air Base. Its establishment followed several previous attempts for aircraft development and construction in the country.

== History ==
The official decision to establish an aircraft manufacturing company by the Greek state was taken in 1917, but the wars that followed delayed its foundation until 1925. It was based in Phaliron near Piraeus (the same area where the AEKKEA-RAAB aircraft maker was later headquartered) and technology and initial management were provided by British Blackburn Aircraft Limited, a company selected as a partner by the Greek military. The first type produced by the factory was the T3 Velos, designed by the British company.

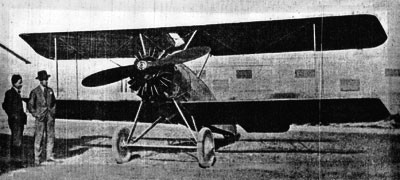
KEA Chelidon, the first plane designed by KEA

In 1927 an all-Greek EAF design was introduced (although according to other sources, a British engineer was a part of the design team), the Chelidon (Swallow) multi-purpose military aircraft. It used a Salmson 120 hp engine and had a maximum speed of 150 km/h. However, only one was built for the Greek Navy, as it was considered inferior to alternative types. Later, the factory produced a series of aircraft types under license, including numbers of Avro 504 aircraft (504N and 504O models), a version of the Armstrong Whitworth Atlas (featuring certain modifications from the original Armstrong-Whitworth model) and the Avro 621 Tutor. At least 61 Tutors were produced, with a rate of seven per month in early 1940, as part of Greece's preparations after the outbreak of World War II.

The company had been fully nationalized since January 1938, when the name KEA was officially used. Production of the PZL P.24, the main fighter used by the Greek Air Force at the time, as well as the Henschel Hs 126K-6 light bomber (for which an order of 32 units had been made to KEA) was not accomplished due to the outbreak of the Greco-Italian War in October 1940; however, manufacture of at least one PZL P.24F by KEA has been documented. This, along with the 621 Tutor (a number of which were incorporated in combat squadrons as liaison aircraft) were the only KEA-produced types that saw action in World War II. Production also covered other areas, including refitting captured aircraft, manufacturing bombs and specialized parts and tools, with its factories employing over 2,100 during the war. During Greece's occupation by the Axis powers the KEA facilities were used by the German Luftwaffe for technical support, while airport infrastructure, where some of its facilities were located, became targets of Allied bombing.

After the war, KEA divisions produced a number of gliders but it eventually focused on maintenance work for the Greek Air Force with only limited aircraft manufacturing activity - which went to the Hellenic Aerospace Industry (HAI) when the latter was founded. Nonetheless, KEA has produced since the 1990s a number of Pegasus UAVs, developed by HAI and a Greek State Research Institute.

The historic company survives until today and is under direct Greek military command.

== Aircraft types produced ==
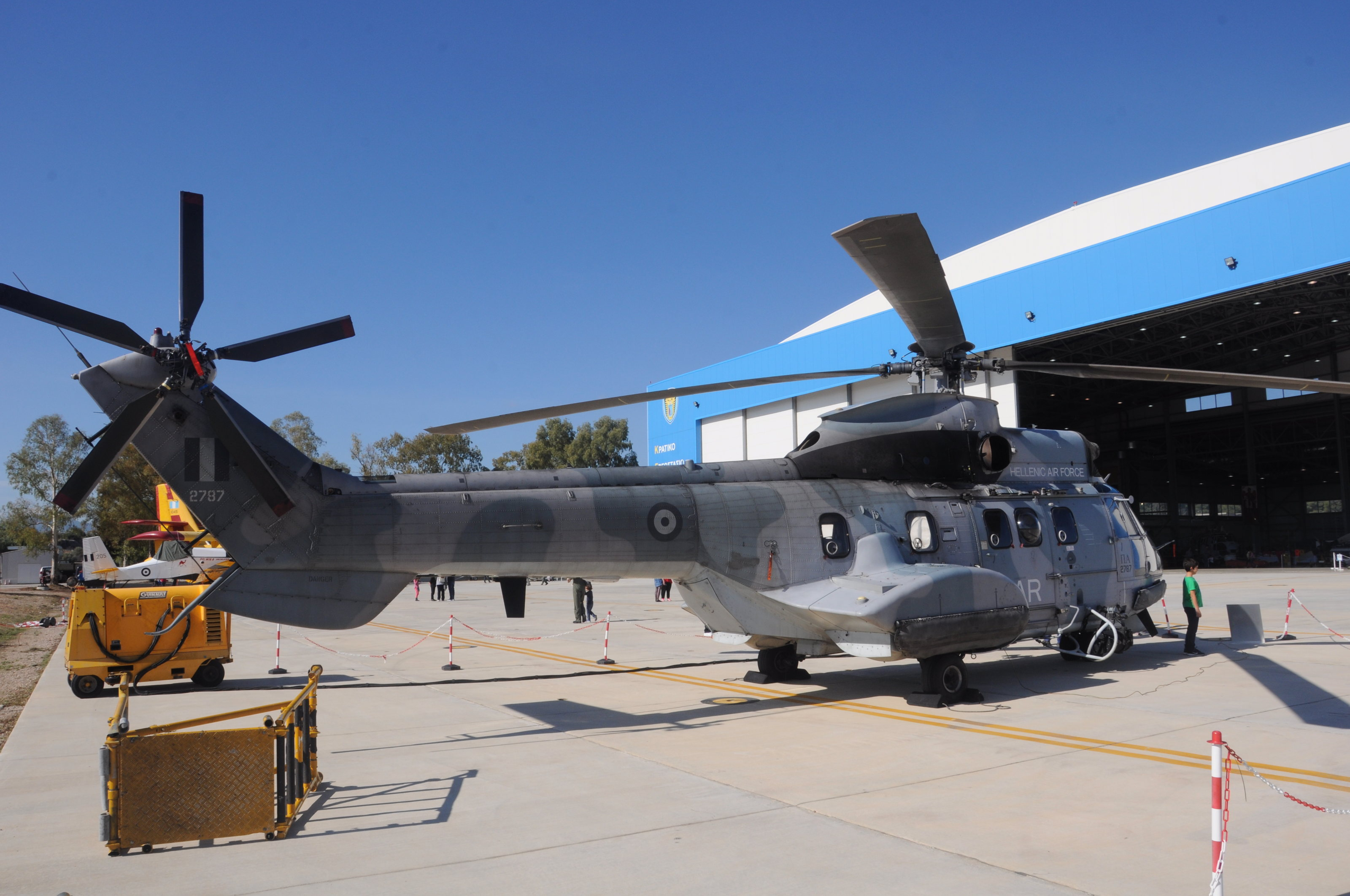
A AS332 Super Puma helicopter in front of the hangar of HAF Aircraft Depot

(Years in parentheses indicate starting of production)

- EAF Blackburn T.3/T.3A Velos (1926). Reconnaissance, training, bomber, designed by Blackburn. 12 built.
- EAF Chelidon (1927). Trainer, surveillance, developed in Greece. 1 built (out of 18 initially ordered).
- EAF Atlas (1931). A lower-cost derivative of the Armstrong Whitworth Atlas army co-operation aircraft, with changes in wing structure, engine and propeller. Proven inferior to the original, 10 built.
- EAF Avro 504 (1934). Trainer (N and O versions). Unknown number built.
- Zoegling glider (1937). 4 built.
- KEA Avro 621 (1938). Trainer and (during World War II) liaison aircraft. At least 61 built.
- Vrona2 glider (1939). 10 built.
- KEA PZL P.24 (1940). Fighter. At least 1 built.
- Schneider SG-38 glider (1953). 3 built.
- Cavka glider (1958). 10 built.
- E1-79 Pegasus (small number produced in the 1990s). UAV designed by Hellenic Aerospace Industry and Hellenic Air Force Research Institute, introduced in 1982.
- Pegasus II (2005). UAV, improved version of Pegasus. 16 units built (or under construction) to date.
