= Antonius Raab =

German aviator

Antonius Raab (1897–1985), was a co-founder of Raab-Katzenstein.

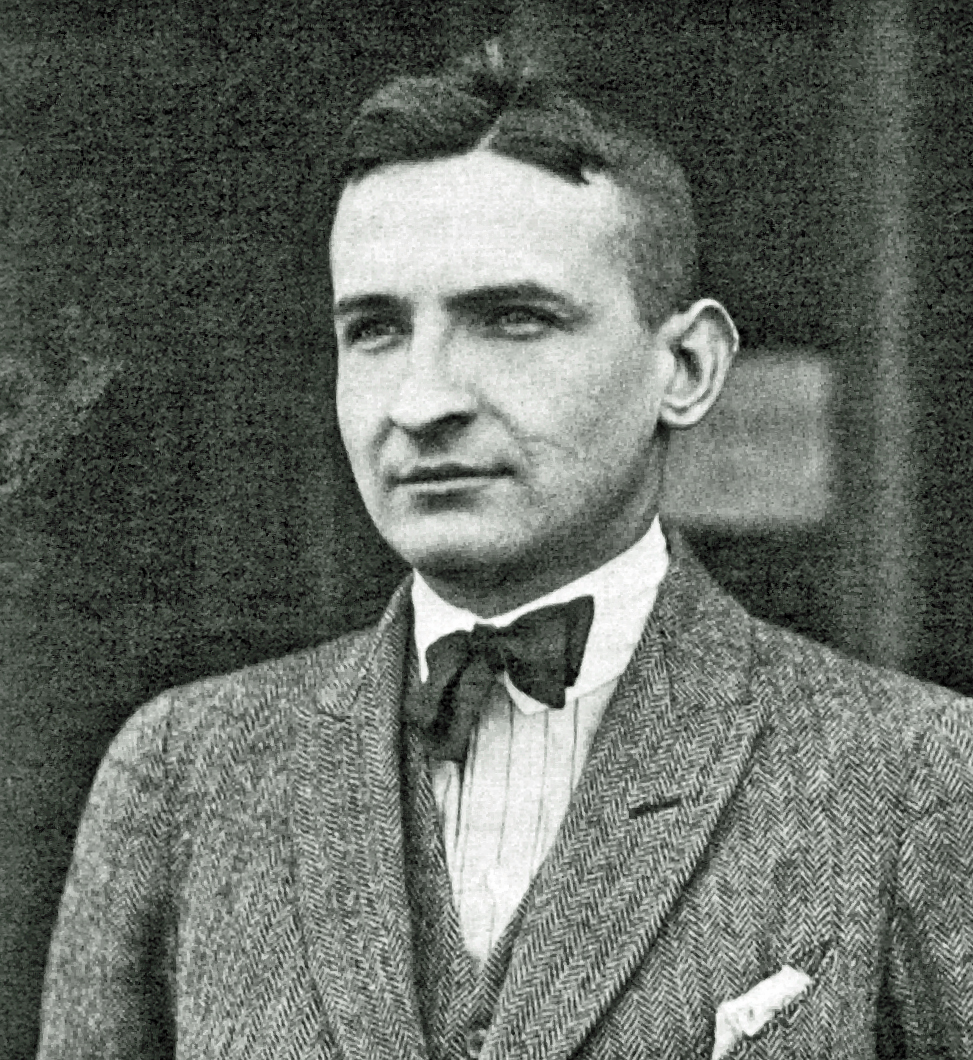
Antonius Raab 1921
