= Gerhard Fieseler =

German WWI flying ace

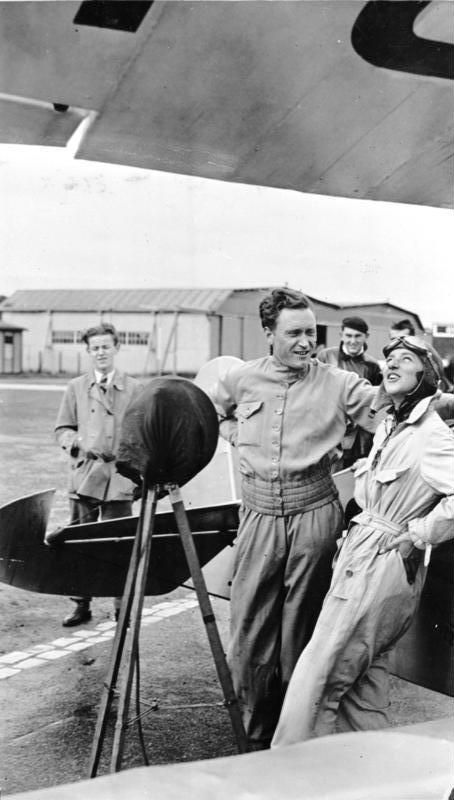
- Gerhard Fieseler and Vera von Bissing at the Aerobatic Championship, Berlin-Tempelhof 1931
- Born: 15 April 1896; Glesch
- Died: 1 September 1987 (aged 91); Kassel
- Military career
- Allegiance: Germany
- Branch: German Army
- Units: Feldflieger Abteilung (Field Flier Detachment) 243
- Conflicts: World War I
- Awards: Military Merit Cross
- Other work: Flying ace, aerobatics champion, and aircraft designer and manufacturer

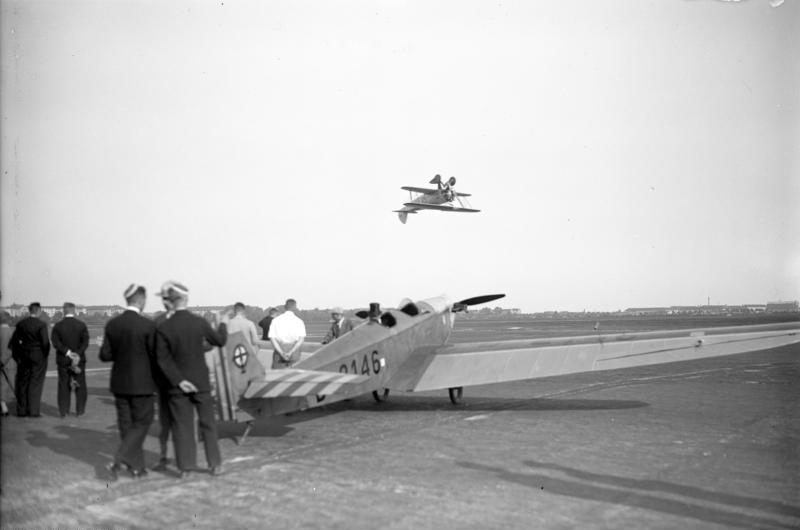
Gerhard Fieseler performing an upside-down flight in a Fieseler F2 Tiger

Gerhard Fieseler (15 April 1896 – 1 September 1987) was a German World War I flying ace, aerobatics champion, and aircraft designer and manufacturer.

== From birth to the 1918 armistice ==
Born in Glesch (near Cologne), Fieseler joined the Air Service of the Imperial German Army in 1915. A crash during training hospitalized him until February 1916, but he had become an observation pilot by October 1916, flying first with Feldflieger Abteilung 243, then with Feldflieger Abteilung 41. In 1917 he qualified as a fighter pilot and was posted on 12 July to the Macedonian front, initially flying a Roland D.II with Jagdstaffel 25. Fieseler scored his first aerial victory on 20 August 1917. A serious illness removed him from active duty from 21 September until 5 November 1917.

Fieseler would not score his second success until 30 January 1918. He was eventually credited with nineteen confirmed aerial victories, with three others unconfirmed. Commissioned in October 1918, he was the highest-scoring German ace on the Eastern Front to survive World War I. He was awarded the Golden Military Merit Cross and the Iron Cross, first and second class.

== Between the World Wars ==
Following the war, he returned to printing, but yearned to return to flying. In 1926, he closed his print shop in Eschweiler and became a flight instructor with the Raab-Katzenstein aircraft company in Kassel and continued to hone his flying skills, becoming an accomplished stunt pilot. In 1927, he performed a particularly daring routine in Zürich and started to command increasingly high fees for appearances. In 1928 while working at Raab-Katzenstein, he designed his own stunt plane, the Fieseler F1 (also known as the Raab-Katzenstein RK-26 Tigerschwalbe), which was offered and sold to a Swedish company called AB Svenska Järnvägverkstäderna (ASJ), which built 25 of the type for Swedish Air Force in the beginning of the 1930s.

In 1930, Raab-Katzenstien was bankrupt, and Fieseler decided to strike out on his own. Using money he had been saving from his aerobatics, he bought the Segelflugzeugbau Kassel sailplane factory and renamed it Fieseler Flugzeugbau. Although he continued with some sailplane manufacturing, from 1932, he set up to start manufacturing sports planes of his own design.

A NSDAP member, Fieseler won contracts to licence-build military aircraft for the new Luftwaffe in 1935. Real success came the following year, when his firm won a design contract against entries from Messerschmitt and Siebel for a STOL liaison/observation plane, that his firm then went on to produce as the Fieseler Fi 156 Storch.

== World War II ==
Gerhard Fieseler Werke produced aircraft for the German military throughout World War II.

== Post World War II ==
Following the war, Fieseler spent some time in US custody. When he was released, he re-opened part of this factory and spent some years building automotive components. He also published an autobiography, Meine Bahn am Himmel (My Road in the Sky).

Fieseler died in Kassel, aged 91.

The aerobatic manoeuvre Fieseler is named after him.

== See also ==
- Fieseler
- Stall turn - the hammerhead turn, stall turn, or Fieseler an aerobatics turn-around manoeuvre
