= Raab-Katzenstein =

- Industry: Aircraft manufacture
- Predecessor: Dietrich-Gobiet Flugzeugwerk
- Founded: November 16, 1925; 100 years ago in Kassel, Germany
- Founder: Antonius Raab; Kurt Katzenstein
- Defunct: 1930
- Fate: Bankrupt
- Successor: Fieseler
- Key people: Gerhard Fieseler

Raab-Katzenstein was a 1920s German aircraft manufacturer based in Kassel.

== History ==
The main character of the company was its designer Gerhard Fieseler. Following World War I, he returned to printing, but yearned to return to flying. In 1926, he closed his print shop in Eschweiler and became a flight instructor with Raab-Katzenstein and continued to hone his flying skills, becoming an accomplished stunt pilot. In 1927, he performed a particularly daring routine in Zürich and started to command increasingly high fees for appearances. In 1928 while working at Raab-Katzenstein, he designed his own stunt plane, the Fieseler F1 (also known as the Raab-Katzenstein RK-26 Tigerschwalbe), which was offered and sold to a Swedish company called AB Svenska Järnvägverkstaderna (ASJA), which built 25 of the type for Swedish Air Force in the beginning of the 1930s.

In 1930, Raab-Katzenstein was bankrupt, and Fieseler decided to strike out on his own. Using money he had been saving from his aerobatics, he bought the Segelflugzeugbau Kassel sailplane factory and renamed it Fieseler Flugzeugbau.

== Aircraft ==
Data from German Aviation 1919-1945

- KL.1 Schwalbe
- RK.2 Pelikan
- RK.6 Kranich
- RK.7 Schmetterling
- RK.8 Marabu
- RK.9 Grasmücke
- RK.22 Ente
- RK.25 Ruhrland
- RK.26 Tigerschwalbe
- RK.27
- RK.29 Deutsche Motte

== See also ==
- AEKKEA-RAAB
- Volksflugzeug
