= Naval Air Service (Greece) =

- Ναυτική Αεροπορική Υπηρεσία
- The Greek version of the roundel was introduced in the Greek Armed Forces in 1917
- Active: 1915–1930
- Country: Greece
- Branch: Hellenic Navy
- Type: Naval aviation

Commanders
- Notable commanders: Aristeidis Moraitinis (1917–1918)

The Naval Air Service (Greek: Ναυτική Αεροπορική Υπηρεσία, ΝΑΥ) was the air arm of the Hellenic Navy from 1915 to 1930.

The first aviation units in the Greek Armed Forces were formed in June 1912. In the subsequent Balkan Wars, the Hellenic Navy was the first in military history to use aircraft to track down and bomb the enemy fleet (1913). The Naval Air Service was officially established during the First World War and participated with the Allies in several missions over the Aegean. After participation in the Greco-Turkish War (1919–1922) a long period of peace followed during which the Naval Air Service was reorganized and upgraded, especially with the establishment of the State Aircraft Factory, which manufactured various types of aircraft. In 1930 the Naval Air Service was merged with the Hellenic Army Aviation and formed the third branch in the Greek Armed Forces, the Hellenic Air Force.

The present-day Hellenic Navy retains an aerial component in the form of the Navy Aviation Command.

== History ==
=== Preparations and Balkan Wars (1912–1913) ===
Aviation had been introduced to Greece in February 1912, when Emmanouil Argyropoulos performed a flight, with his privately owned Nieuport IV.G aircraft, around Athens. An hour later a second flight was carried on with the Prime Minister of Greece, Eleftherios Venizelos as passenger. Venizelos, impressed by the potential of air warfare, suggested that Greece should take advance of this new weapon. The following months a French military mission took up the development of Greek aviation by creating a fleet of four Maurice Farman MF.7 airplanes. In June 1912, aviator Dimitrios Kamperos modified one of the Farmans into a hydroplane, giving it the name of the mythical hero Daedalus.

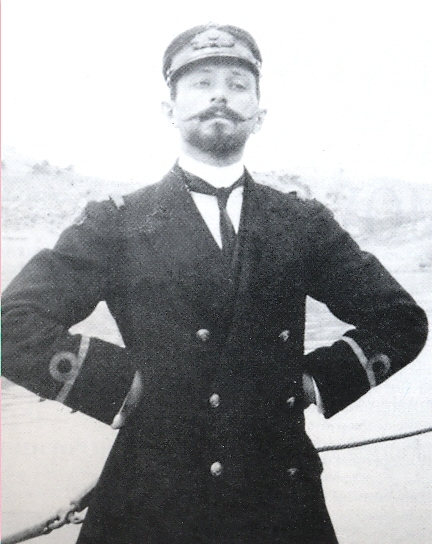
Aristeidis Moraitinis, commander of the Hellenic Naval Air Service (1917–1918)

When the Balkan Wars broke out in October 1912, these airplanes performed a number of reconnaissance and bombing missions; the most notable was a sortie against the Ottoman fleet anchorage in the Dardanelles, where First Lieutenant Michael Moutoussis and Ensign Aristeidis Moraitinis spotted the Ottoman fleet and dropped four bombs. This mission is regarded as the first naval-air operation in military history and was widely commented upon in the press, both Greek and international. Meanwhile, the Hellenic Navy, in the process of setting up its air arm, bought a fleet of Sopwith Gunbus seaplanes (also known as Greek Seaplanes).

=== World War I ===
At the beginning of 1914 credits were voted for the creation of a naval aerodrome in Eleusina, Attica. Meanwhile, despite limited funds Aristeidis Moraitinis managed to establish the first naval aviation school and corps. In spring 1915 the establishment of an independent Naval Aviation Department within the Ministry for Naval Affairs and the incorporation of the Greek naval air fleet into the Greek Navy ensured the foundation of the Naval Air Service (NAY). Meanwhile, disagreements between King Constantine I and Prime Minister Eleftherios Venizelos over whether Greece should enter World War I, lead to political instability and the National Schism (1914–1916). Greece officially joined the Triple Entente at June 1917, however the anti-royalist party of the country under the leadership of Venizelos formed a Movement of National Defence that supported the Allied military operations in the region from December 1916.

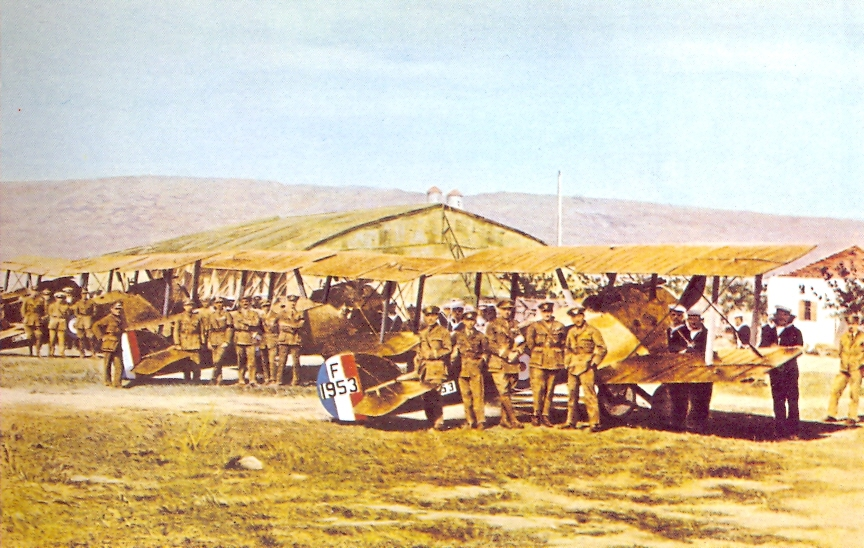
"Z" Squadron at Moudros Airfield ready for inspection (1917)

During the following years (1917–1918), a fighter and bomber squadron, known as "Z" Squadron (Greek: Ζήτα Σμήνος), was created by Greek personnel under direct Royal Naval Air Service command and carried out operations in the northern Aegean, based at Moudros (Lemnos) and Thasos. Moreover, a joint Army-Navy flight school was established at Moudros. The activity of "Z" Squadron included anti-submarine sweeps, attacks against targets of vital importance, as well as dogfights. Among the most significant missions were the night raids against the Gallipoli-Constantinople peninsula in June 1917, the heavy bombings of enemy positions in the Macedonian front, as well as İzmir, Ottoman Empire. In 1918 the Naval Aviation had four squadrons of Sopwith Camel biplanes and other aircraft, while each one counted ca. 10–12 aircraft.

Aristeidis Moraitinis, the commander of the Hellenic Naval Air Service, acquired the nickname the Fearless Aviator by his British colleagues and counted nine victories in total, becoming so Greece's only World War I ace. In one occasion, on 20 January 1918, Moraitinis, fought ten enemy aircraft which attacked two British Sopwith Baby seaplanes he was escorting on their way to bomb the Turkish battlecruiser Yavuz Sultan Selim (the former German SMS Goeben) and managed to shoot down three of them.

=== Greco-Turkish War and Interwar period ===
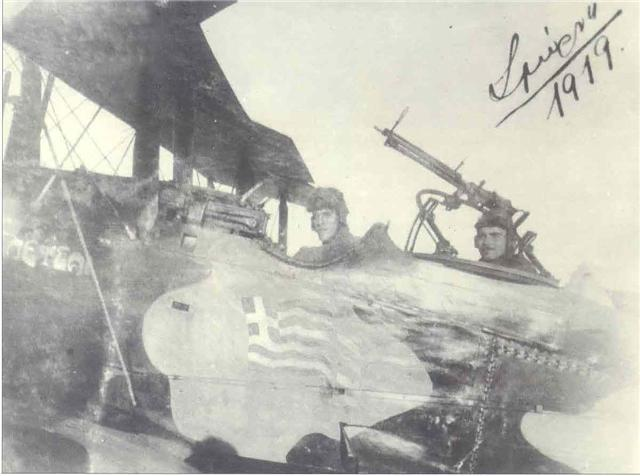
Airco DH.9 named "Spetsai", İzmir (1919)

In the following Greco-Turkish War of 1919–1922 the Naval Aviation formed one squadron, that together with additional four of the Army Aviation Service participated in operations in Asia Minor. This squadron (Greek: Ναυτική Αεροπορική Μοίρα Σμύρνης) initially consisted of 10 Airco DH.9 bombers and 15 Sopwith Camel F.1 fighters.

The Asia Minor Campaign was followed by a long period of peace during which both the Hellenic Army and Naval Aviation Services were reorganized and upgraded. From 1925 new types of aircraft of British and, mainly, French manufacture were delivered. At 1925, in co-operation with the British Company Blackburn Aircraft, the State Aircraft Factory (KEA) was set up in Phaleron, near Athens. The factory developed a number of aircraft that were designed by Blackburn Aircraft and built under license, like the two-seat torpedo carrier, T3A Velos and the KEA Chelidon, as well as the Armstrong Whitworth Atlas and the Avro 504. On the other hand, a new Naval Aviation school was established at Tatoi, Attica, in 1926.

In 1930 the Air Ministry was founded and the Hellenic Air Force was established as a unified independent branch of the Hellenic Armed Forces. Prime Minister Eleftherios Venizelos was sworn in as the first Air Minister and assigned the reorganisation of the branch to the veteran aviator Alexandros Zannas.

== Notable personnel ==
- Aristeidis Moraitinis, commander of the Hellenic Naval Air Service (1917–1918) and World War I ace.
- Konstantinos Panagiotou, commander (1918).
- Pantelis Psychas, World War I aviator, awarded the British Distinguished Service Cross.
- Spyridon Hambas, World War I aviator.
- Dimitrios Argyropoulos, World War I aviator and the first casualty of the Hellenic Naval Air Service (1917).
- Thanos Veloudios, distinguished during the Greco-Turkish War (1919–1922).

== Aircraft of the Hellenic Naval Air Service ==
=== 1912–1922 ===
- Airco DH.4
- Airco DH.6
- Airco DH.9
- Ansaldo A.1 Balilla
- Astra Hydroplane
- Bristol Scout C
- Fairey Hamble Baby
- Henry Farman H.F.20
- Henry Farman H.F.22
- Henry Farman H.F.27
- Maurice Farman Hydravion
- Royal Aircraft Factory B.E.2c
- Royal Aircraft Factory B.E.2e
- Short Type 184
- Sopwith Greek Seaplane (Gunbus)
- Sopwith 1½ Strutter Type 9400
- Sopwith 1½ Strutter Type 9700
- Sopwith Baby
- Sopwith Bat Boat
- Sopwith Camel F.1
- Sopwith Pup

=== 1923–1930 ===
- Armstrong Whitworth Atlas
- Avro 504N/O
- Blackburn Velos T.3A
- Bristol F.2b Fighter Mk IV
- Hanriot H.41
- Hawker Horsley MkII
- KEA Chelidon

== See also ==
- History of the Hellenic Air Force
