= Christos Adamidis =

Greek military aviator

Major General Christos Adamidis
- Χρήστος Αδαμίδης
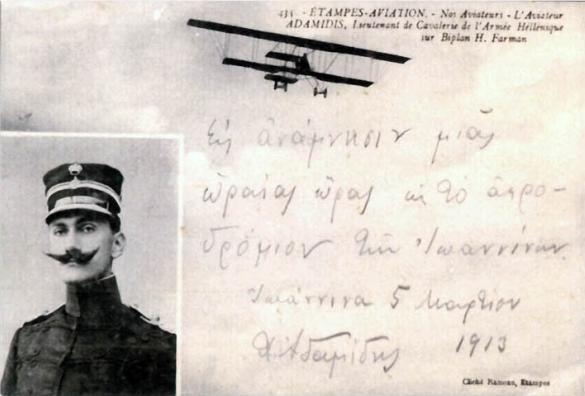
- A postcard of Christos Adamidis c. 1913
- Born: c. 1885; Ioannina, Janina Vilayet, Ottoman Empire (now Greece)
- Died: c. 1949; Athens, Kingdom of Greece
- Military career
- Allegiance: Kingdom of Greece; (Greece) Second Hellenic Republic
- Branch: Hellenic Army
- Service years: 1912–1935
- Rank: Major General
- Unit: Hellenic Army Air Service
- Commands: Hellenic Army Air Service (1927–1930); Aeronautics Command (1931–1935)
- Conflicts: Balkan Wars: First Balkan War; Battle of Bizani

Christos Adamidis (Greek: Χρήστος Αδαμίδης, 1885–1949) was a Hellenic Army officer and pioneer of military aviation. He was one of the first Greek officers who received aviation training in France and later participated in air operations during the Balkan Wars.

== Balkan Wars ==
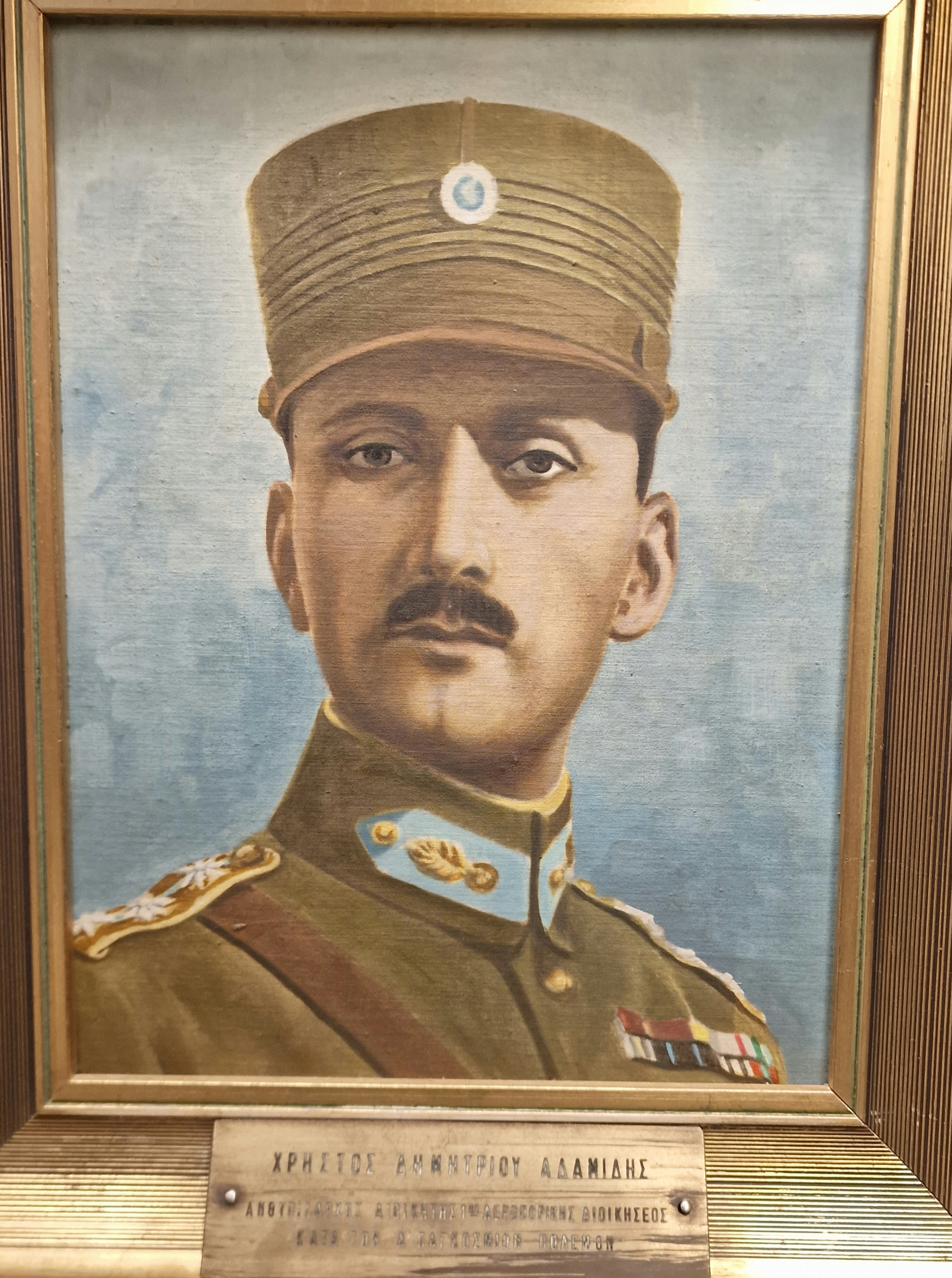
Contemporary portrait of Christos Adamidis, from the Athens War Museum

Adamidis was born in Ioannina in 1885, then part of the Janina Vilayet of the Ottoman Empire. He initially became a cavalry officer in the Hellenic Army. In 1912, Adamidis was selected as one of the first three Greek officers, together with Dimitrios Kamberos and Michael Moutoussis, in order to receive aviation training in France and to man the newly established aviation branch of the Hellenic Army.

During the following Balkan Wars he was positioned in Epirus front where he performed reconnaissance and bombing missions against Ottoman positions during the Battle of Bizani. These missions also included leaflet and food dropping to the population of Ioannina, the urban center of the area, who was starving due to the extended military conflicts. The Greek forces finally won the battle and on 6 March [O.S. 21 February] 1913, Ioannina came under Greek control. On that day, Adamidis landed his Farman MF.7 aircraft on the Town Hall square of the city, to the adulation of an enthusiastic crowd.

== Later career ==
In 1927 Adamidis became commander of the air arm of the Hellenic Army. In June 1928, Adamidis together with Lt Evangelos Papadakis, flew around the Mediterranean Sea with a Breguet 19 aircraft. The tour lasted 20 days covering a distance of 12,000 km (7,456 mi), and was considered a significant achievement in relation to the capabilities of Greek aviation of that time. In 1931, when the Air Force became a separate branch of the Hellenic Armed Forces, he was appointed director of the Aeronautics Department.

Adamidis was discharged in 1935 with the rank of Major General.
