= List of flying aces from Greece =

This is a list of fighter aces from Greece.

== World War I ==
Greece provided only one flying ace in World War I:

Name	Kills	Awards	Notes
Aristeidis Moraitinis	9	DSO, War Cross (Greece)	Flew partly with the Hellenic Naval Air Service and partly with the British Royal Navy Air Service.

== World War II ==
Greece had six flying aces in World War II.

Name	Kills	Awards	Notes
Andreas Antoniou	6		Greek Squadron Leader, fought during the Greco-Italian War of 1940-41. Served with the 22nd Pursuit Squadron. Flew the PZL P.24.
Panagiotis Argyropoulos	5	DFC	Distinguished fighter pilot who served with the 22nd Pursuit Squadron during the Greco-Italian War, achieving several aerial victories against Italian aircraft. In April 1941, he shot down the first German Ju-87 Stuka destroyed by Greek fire and took part in the famous aerial battle of Trikala, where he also downed a Bf-109. After Greece fell, he escaped to the Middle East and joined the reconstituted Greek Air Force within the RAF, flying Hawker Hurricanes with the 335th Squadron. For his combat achievements he was awarded the Distinguished Flying Cross along with other Greek and Allied honors. He was killed in service on June 15, 1945, when his Spitfire crashed into the sea near the Bay of Vari.
Marinos Mitralexis	5	Cross of Valour (Greece)	Fought in the Greco-Italian War in the 22nd Pursuit Squadron. Bringing an Italian bomber down by ramming its tail made him a popular hero figure. After the fall of Greece, escaped to North Africa and fought with Greek squadron under the Allied Desert Air Force.
Spiros Nickolas "Steve" Pisanos	10	Croix de Guerre (France)	Greek immigrant to the United States, fought with RAF and USAAF, and credited with 10 kills with the US 4th Fighter Group (European Theater). Remained with this RAF Eagle Squadron fighter unit rather than join the Royal Hellenic Air Force fighting with the RAF. In March 1944, bailed out over France and was rescued by the French Resistance. As a test pilot post he flew the jet Lockheed P-80 Shooting Star. After a stint as a pilot with TWA he returned to USAAF. Flew the Spitfire V, Republic P-47 Thunderbolt and North American P-51 Mustang. In 2008 he published The Flying Greek, his autobiography and war memoir.
Ioannis Agorastos "John" Plagis	16	DSO, DFC & Bar, DFC (Netherlands)	As a child of Greek immigrants in Rhodesia, he flew with the Royal Air Force, 1940-1945. Joined No. 249 Squadron and flew the Spitfire V in defence of Malta. After a period of rest he again flew the Spitfire and later the North American Mustang III in action over Europe. He was the highest-scoring ace of Greek nationality. Post-war he adopted British nationality and remained in the RAF flying the Gloster Meteor. After retirement he returned to Rhodesia where he later committed suicide.
Basilios Michael Vassilios "Vass" Vassiliades	10	DFC, DFM	A Greek from the island of Chios, born in 1920. He was a student in UK at the time war broke out and unable to return home he volunteered for the RAF. Credited with 11+1/2 victories, awarded the DFC and DFM. Fought over Europe (France, D-Day, Germany) and killed in action 25 March 1945 during a ground attack. His death is mentioned in The Big Show (Le Grand Cirque) written by the French ace Pierre Clostermann with whom he occasionally shared a plane while based in Volkel, the Netherlands. He flew Spitfire Mk.V, the Mustang III and Hawker Tempest V. He became the second Greek ace retaining Greek nationality. He is also the only Greek pilot to have his name remembered on the Air Forces Memorial, Runnymede.
John Lolos	5	DFC, AM	Fought in the South West Pacific flying P-47 Thunderbolts with 341st Fighter Squadron, 348th Fighter Group. He claimed five Japanese Zeros and Hamps in New Guinea.

== See also ==
- List of World War I flying aces
- List of World War II aces by country
