= Hellenic Air Force =

Air warfare branch of Greece's military

- Πολεμική Αεροπορία; Polemikí Aeroporía
- Hellenic Air Force badge
- Founded: 1912; 114 years ago
- Country: Greece
- Branch: Air force
- Role: Aerial warfare
- Size: Approx. 42,500 personnel 635 aircraft 8 types of air defence systems
- Part of: Hellenic Armed Forces
- Nickname: HAF
- Patron: Archangels Michael and Gabriel
- Mottos: Greek: Αἰὲν Ὑψικρατεῖν; 'Always Dominate the Heights'
- Colours
- Anniversaries: 8 November
- Engagements: Balkan Wars; World War I; Greco-Turkish War (1919–1922); World War II; Air operations during the Greek Civil War; Korean War; Turkish invasion of Cyprus; Operation Desert Storm; War on terror; 2011 military intervention in Libya; Evacuation of nationals during the Sudanese civil war; 2026 Iran war; Task Force to defend Cyprus
- Website: www.haf.gr

Commanders
- Chief of Air Force General Staff: Air Marshal Dimosthenis Grigoriadis
- Notable commanders: Air Commodore Michael Moutoussis; Wing Commander Kostas Perrikos

Insignia
- Roundel

- Fin flash

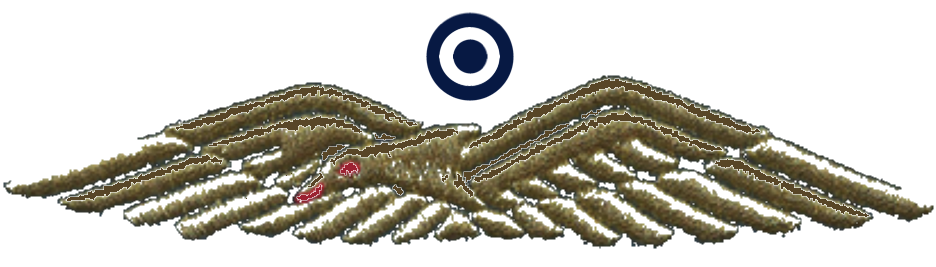
- Aviator badge

Aircraft flown
- Bomber: F-4 Phantom II
- Fighter: F-16, Rafale, Mirage 2000
- Helicopter: CH-47, NH90, AS332, Bell UH-1
- Reconnaissance: Embraer R-99, Pegasus II, Heron TP
- Trainer: M-346 Master, P2002 Sierra, T-6 Texan II,
- Transport: C-27J Spartan, C-130B/H, Falcon 7X, ERJ-135, Gulfstream V

The Hellenic Air Force (HAF; Greek: Πολεμική Αεροπορία, romanized: Polemikí Aeroporía, lit. 'Military Aviation', sometimes abbreviated as ΠΑ) is the air force of Greece (Hellenic being the endonym for Greek in the Greek language). It is considered to be one of the largest air forces in NATO, and is globally placed 18th out of 139 countries. Under the Kingdom of Greece from 1935 to 1973, it was previously known as the Royal Hellenic Air Force (RHAF) (Ἑλληνικὴ Βασιλικὴ Ἀεροπορία, Ellinikí Vasilikí Aeroporía).

The Hellenic Air Force is one of the three branches of the Hellenic Armed Forces, and its mission is to guard and protect Greek airspace, provide air assistance and support to the Hellenic Army and the Hellenic Navy, and to provide humanitarian aid in Greece and around the world. The Hellenic Air Force includes approximately 33,000 active troops, of whom 11,750 are career officers, 14,000 are professional soldiers (ΕΠ.ΟΠ.), 7,250 are volunteer conscripts, and 1,100 are women. The motto of the Hellenic Air Force is the ancient Greek phrase Αἰὲν Ὑψικρατεῖν (Aièn Hypsikrateîn, 'Always Dominate the Heights'), and the HAF emblem represents a flying eagle in front of the Hellenic Air Force roundel. The General Air Staff (GEA) is based at the Papagou Camp in the Municipality of Filothei - Psychiko of the Prefecture of Attica.

== History ==
=== Origins ===
In 1911, the Greek Government appointed French specialists to form the Hellenic Aviation Service. Six Greek officers were sent to France for training, while the first four Farman type aircraft were ordered. All six graduated from the Farman school in Étampes near Paris, but only four subsequently served in aviation. The first Greek civilian aviator that was given military rank was Emmanuel Argyropoulos, who flew in a Nieuport IV.G. 'Alkyon' aircraft, on 8 February 1912. The first military flight was made on 13 May 1912, by Lieutenant Dimitrios Kamberos. In June, Kamberos flew with the 'Daedalus', a Farman Aviation Works aircraft that had been converted into a seaplane, setting a new average speed world record at 110 kilometres per hour (68 miles per hour). In September of the same year, the Greek Army fielded its first squadron, the 'Aviators Company' (Greek: Λόχος Αεροπόρων).

=== Balkan Wars and aftermath (1912–1930) ===
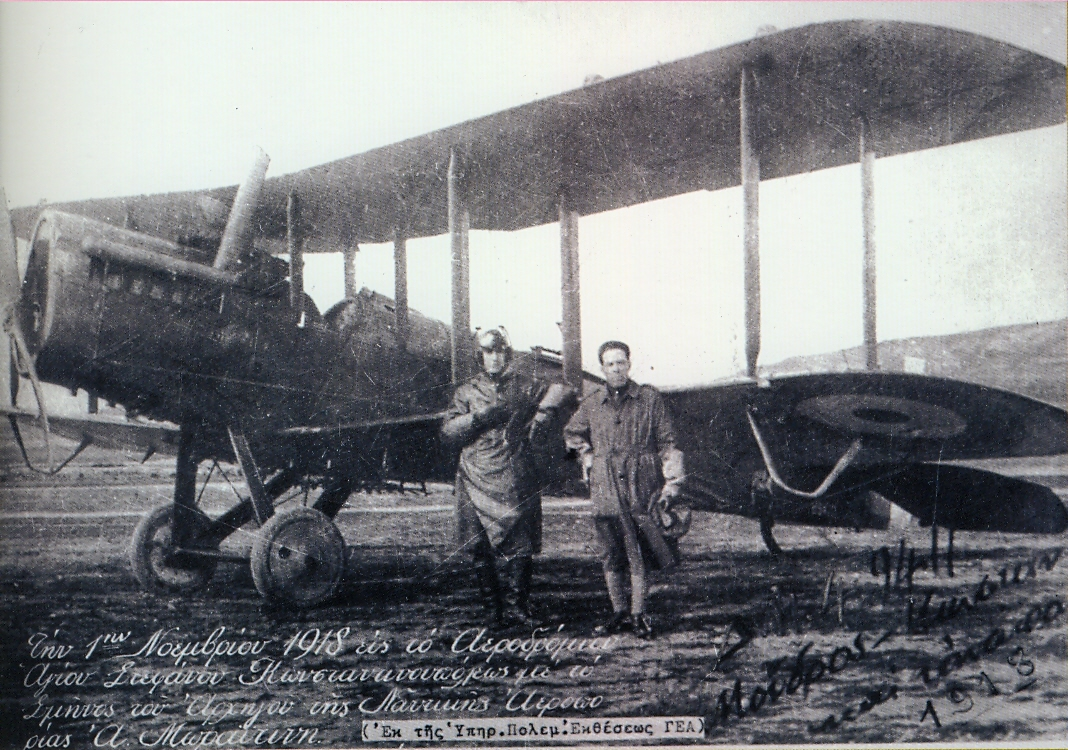
Greek aviators at the San Stefano airfield, after the Mudros armistice.

On 5 October 1912, Kamberos flew the first combat mission, a reconnaissance flight over Thessaly. This was on the first day of the Balkan Wars. On the same day a similar mission was flown by German mercenaries in Ottoman service, over the Thrace front against the Bulgarian Army. The Greek and the Ottoman missions, coincidentally flown on the same day, were the first military aviation missions in the history of conventional war. As a matter of fact, all Balkan countries used military aircraft and foreign mercenaries during the Balkan Wars.

24 January 1913, saw the first naval co-operation mission in history, which took place over the Dardanelles. Aided by the Royal Hellenic Navy, destroyer RHNS Velos, 1st Lieutenant Michael Moutoussis and Ensign Aristeidis Moraitinis flew the Farman hydroplane and drew up a diagram of the positions of the Turkish fleet, against which they dropped four bombs. This was not the first air-to-ground attack in military history, as there was a precedent in the Turkish-Italian war of 1911, but the first recorded attack against ships from the air.

Initially, the Hellenic Army and the Royal Hellenic Navy operated separate Army Aviation and Naval Aviation units. During the Balkan Wars, various French Henry and Maurice Farman aircraft types were used. The Hellenic Naval Air Service was officially founded in 1914 by the then Commander in Chief (CnC) of the Royal Hellenic Navy, British Admiral Mark Kerr. Greek aviation units participated in World War I and the Asia Minor Campaign, equipped by the Allies with a variety of French and British designs.

=== Foundation, World War II and Civil War (1930–1950) ===
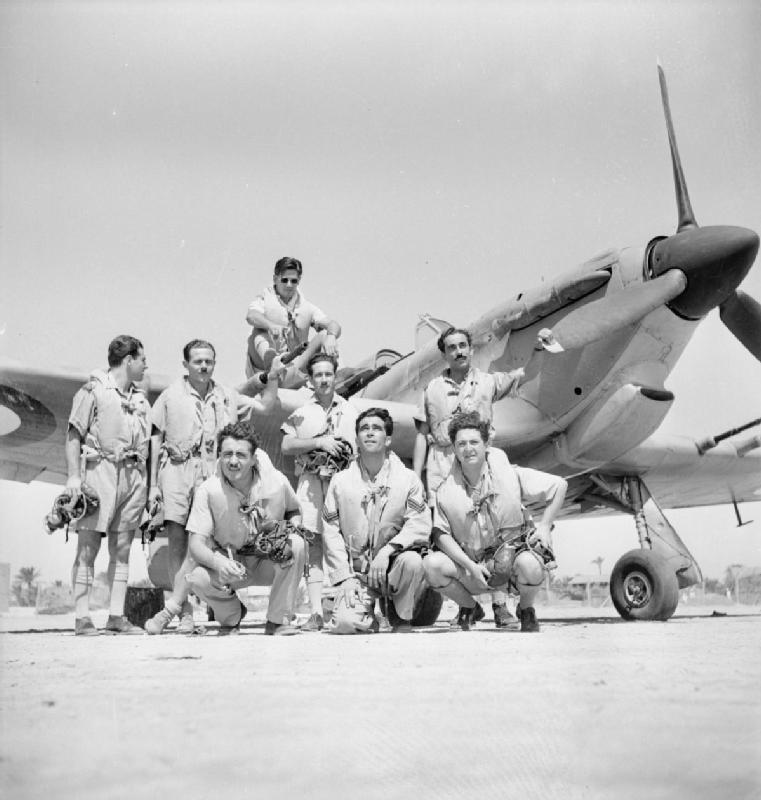
Greek pilots of the 335th Fighter Squadron in Egypt, 1942.

In 1930, the Aviation Ministry was founded, establishing the Air Force as the third branch of the Hellenic Armed Forces. The Hellenic Army Air Service and Hellenic Naval Air Service were merged into a single service, the Royal Hellenic Air Force. In 1931, the Hellenic Air Force Academy, the Icarus School (Greek: Σχολή Ικάρων), was founded.

At the end of 1936, Greece ordered 36 Polish PZL P.24 fighter aircraft, which entered service with the 21st, 22nd and 23rd Pursuit Squadrons and after completion of deliveries in 1938, formed the core of the RHAF fighter force. The planes were well armed; 12 planes of the P.24F version had 2 machine guns and 2 20mm autocannons, the remaining 24 planes of the P.24G version had 4 machine guns.

In 1939, an order for 24 Marcel Bloch MB.151 fighter aircraft was placed, but only nine of the aircraft reached Greece, since the outbreak of World War II prevented the French from completing the order. The aircraft entered service in the 24th Pursuit Squadron (MD – Moira Dioxis) of the air force.

During the Italian invasion of Greece (1940–1941) in the Second World War, although being severely outnumbered and counting only 79 aircraft against 380 fighters and bombers of the Italian Regia Aeronautica, RHAF managed to successfully resist the assault. On 30 October, two days after the start of the war, there was the first air battle. Some Henschel Hs126s of 3/2 Flight of 3 Observation Mira took off to locate Italian Army columns. But they were intercepted and attacked by Fiat CR.42 Falcos of 393^{a} Squadriglia. A first Henschel was hit and crashed, killing its observer, Pilot Officer Evanghelos Giannaris, the first Greek aviator to die in the war. A second Hs126 was downed over Mount Smolikas, killing Pilot Officer Lazaros Papamichail and Sergeant Constantine Yemenetzis. On 2 November 1940, a Breguet 19 intercepted the 3 Alpine Division Julia while it was penetrating the Pindos mountain range in an attempt to occupy Metsovo. On the same day, 2nd Lieutenant Marinos Mitralexis having run out of ammunition, aimed the nose of his PZL P.24 right into the tail of an enemy CANT Z.1007bis bomber, smashing the rudder and sending the aircraft out of control.

After 65 days of war, the RHAF had lost 31 officers, seven wounded, plus four NCOs killed and five wounded. Meanwhile, the number of combat aircraft had dropped to 28 fighters and 7 battle-worthy bombers. By March 1941, the Italian invasion on air and ground had been successfully pushed back, aided by the vital contribution of the RHAF to the Greek victory. During the Greco-Italian War the Royal Hellenic Air Force shot down 68 enemy aircraft (official records) and claimed another 24. The British RAF claimed 150 additional air victories against Italian aircraft. However, the Italian Air Force recorded only 65 aircraft lost, during the entire campaign against the Greeks and later the British, with 495 additional aircraft reported as damaged.

In April 1941, the German Wehrmacht invaded Greece in order to assist the Italian assault. During this second wave of foreign invasion, the Luftwaffe eventually succeeded in destroying most of the Royal Hellenic Air Force. However, some aircraft managed to escape to the Middle East, including five Avro Anson, one Dornier Do 22, one Arado 196, and three Avro 626.

During the German occupation of Greece, the Air Force was rebuilt under the expatriated Greek Air Force Ministry based in Cairo. Three squadrons were built, operating under the command of the British RAF. These squadrons were the 13th Light Bombing Squadron flying Avro Ansons, Bristol Blenheims, and Martin Baltimores, and the 335 and 336 Fighting Squadrons flying Hawker Hurricane I and IIs and Spitfire V types. The RHAF squadrons in the Middle East flew a variety of missions, including convoy patrols, anti-submarine search, offensive patrols, reconnaissance, attack and interception of enemy aircraft. In Summer 1943, the Greek squadrons participated in the attack against the German Wehrmacht on the island of Crete, and then from May to November 1944 in Italy. During those years, seventy Greek pilots were lost.

During World War II, Greek pilots who were flying with the RAF achieved many victories. Rhodesian-born Wing Commander John Agorastos Plagis shot down 16 enemy aircraft over Malta and Western Europe. Lieutenant Vasilios Michael Vassiliadis was credited with 11.5 enemy aircraft over Western Europe before he was killed in action on 15 March 1945, over Germany. Steve Pisanos, an immigrant to the US in 1938, joined an Eagle Squadron of American volunteers in the RAF and fought over Western Europe. He later joined the USAAF and acquired US citizenship and continued to fly with the same squadron, now part of the USAF 4th FG. He had achieved ten victories with the USAAF by 1944.

After Greece's liberation in 1944, RHAF returned to Greece and subsequently played a decisive role in the Greek Civil War, which lasted until 1950. By then, it was re-equipped with Supermarine Spitfire Mk.IX, Spitfire Mk.XVI fighters, and Curtiss SB2C Helldiver bombers.

=== Post-war developments (1950–1970) ===
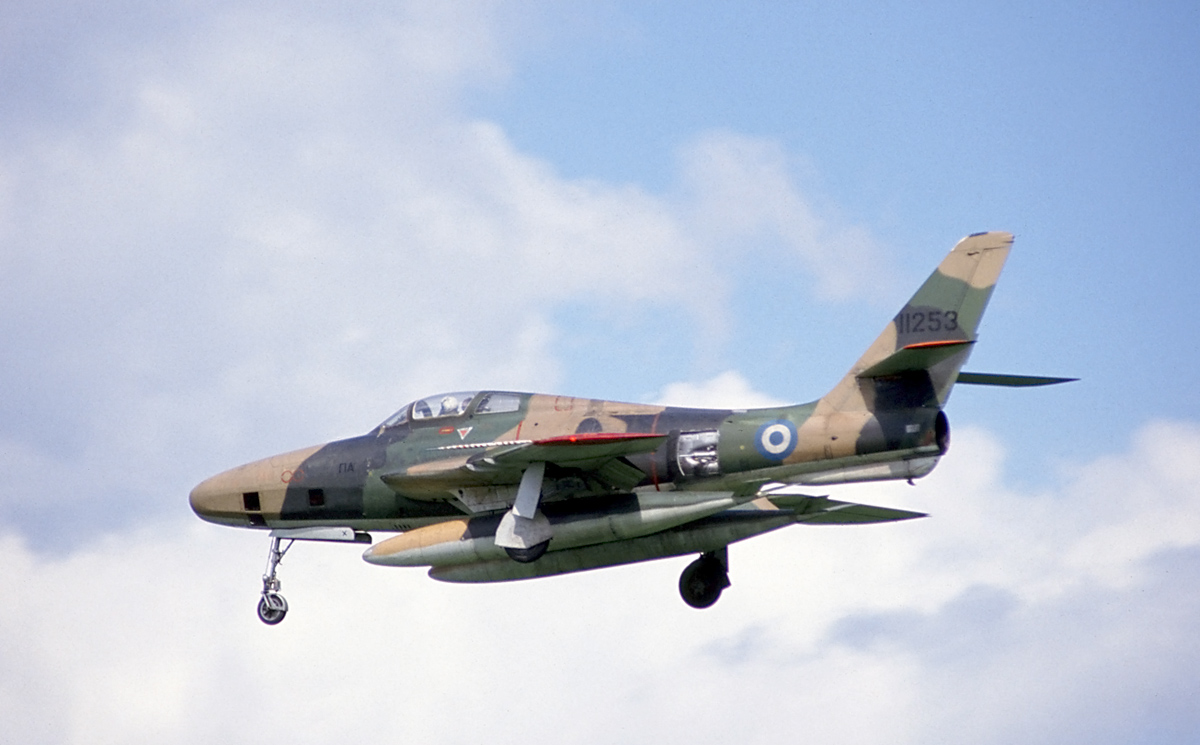
Hellenic Air Force RF-84F Thunderflash in 1988.

After the end of the Greek Civil War in November 1950, Greece sent seven Douglas C-47 Dakota transport aircraft of the 13th Transport Aircraft Squadron to South Korea to assist the United Nations (UN). Greek aircraft participated in many battles including Battle of Chosin and operated in Korea until May 1955. Greek pilots flew thousands of missions including air evacuations, personnel transport, intelligence gathering, and supply flights. In 1952 Greece joined NATO, and the Air Force was rebuilt and organised according to NATO standards. New aircraft, including jets, were introduced.

The first jet fighter flown by the RHAF was the Republic F-84G Thunderjet in 1955. It was also flown by the first Air Force aerobatic team 337 SQ 'Hellenic Flame' (Greek: Ελληνική Φλόγα). The RF-84F entered service with the 348 Tactical Reconnaissance Squadron in 1956. Although the F-84G was replaced by the Canadair Sabre 2 in 1954 and 1955 after one-hundred units were retired from the Royal Canadian Air Force and upgraded in the United Kingdom before entering service with the RHAF, the RF-84F remained in service until 1991. The Lockheed T-33 was also delivered as a trainer in 1955. Some RT-33s were used for reconnaissance missions.

In the late 1960s, the RHAF acquired new jet aircraft. These included the Convair F-102 Delta Dagger (in service 1969–1975), the Lockheed F-104G Starfighter, and the Northrop F-5 Freedom Fighter. The F-104 and F-5 stayed in service until the mid- to late 1980s.

In the mid-1970s, the Hellenic Air Force was further modernised with deliveries of the Dassault Mirage F1CG fleet, the Vought A-7 Corsair II (including a number of TA-7Hs), and the first batch of McDonnell-Douglas F-4 Phantom IIs.

In 1993, the United States Air Force delivered sixty-two additional A-7Es and TA-7Cs increasing further the air-to-ground capabilities of the HAF. These aircraft remained in service until 2011.

=== Modernisation (1980–1997) ===
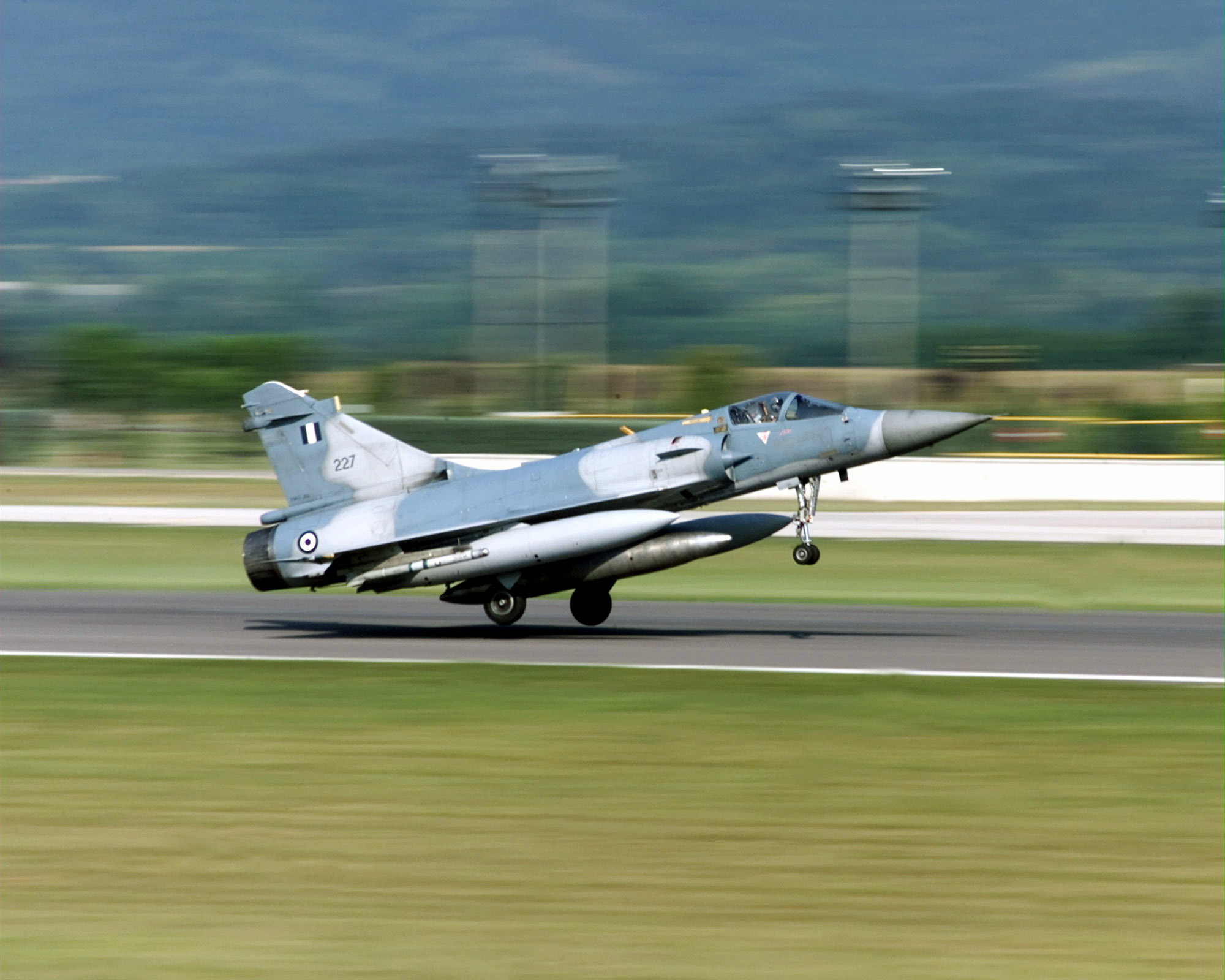
Hellenic Air Force Mirage 2000 taking off.

Until the late 1980s, the Air Force deployed missiles armed with U.S. nuclear warheads using the LTV TA-7C Corsair II. As a result of Greco-Turkish tension caused by the 1974 Turkish invasion of Cyprus, the U.S. removed its nuclear weapons from Greek and Turkish alert units to storage. Greece saw this as another pro-Turkish move by NATO and withdrew its forces from NATO's military command structure from 1974 to 1980.

In March 1985, the Greek government announced the purchase of thirty-four F-16C and six F-16D Block 30 variant in the 'Peace Xenia I' modernisation programme. In the same month, Greece ordered thirty-six single-seat Mirage 2000EG and four two-seat Mirage 2000BG, as part of the 'Talos' modernisation programme.

Subsequently, in 1989, the first fourth-generation fighter jets were introduced, marking the beginning of a new era: the first Mirage 2000 EG/BG aircraft were delivered to the 114 Combat Wing in Tanagra air force base, and equipped the 331 and 332 squadrons. In January 1989, the first F-16C/D Block 30 arrived in 111 Combat Wing in Nea Anchialos air force base, and were allocated to the 330 'Thunder' and 346 'Jason' interceptor squadrons in Larissa air force base.

On 29 March 1991, the RF-84F were retired from service after 34 years and 7 months of operational life. In November 1992, more RF-4Es were delivered to the 348 'Eyes' Tactical Reconnaissance Squadron.

In 1993, the 'Peace Xenia II' modernisation programme began. Greece ordered thirty-two F-16C and eight F-16D, Block 50 variant. The first Block 50 was delivered on 25 July 1997. These aircraft, equipped with the LANTIRN navigation and targeting pod, along with AIM-120 AMRAAM and AGM-88 HARM missiles, were allocated to the 341 'Arrow' and 347 'Perseus' squadrons in Nea Anchialos air force base. The basic mission of 341 'Arrow' squadron is Suppression of Enemy Air Defenses (SEAD). The role of 347 'Perseus' squadron is air-to-ground missions.

=== Entering the 21st century (1998–2007) ===
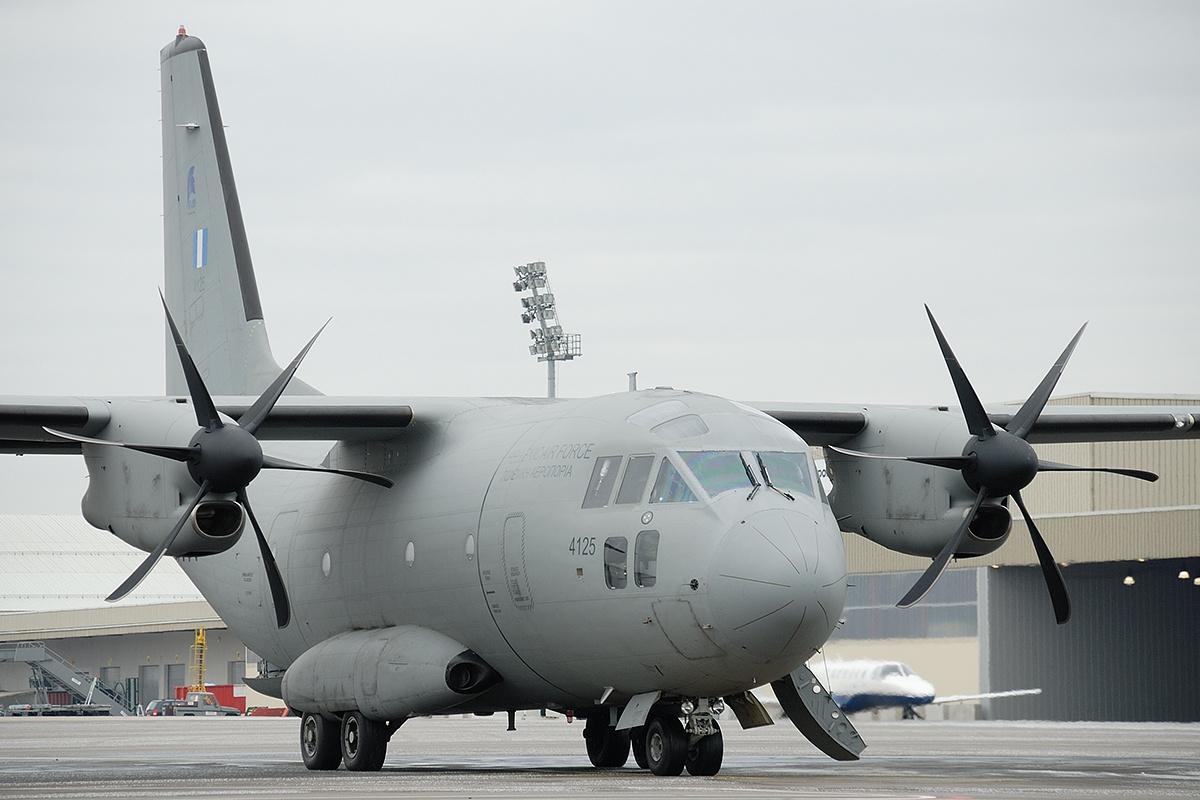
A Hellenic Air Force C-27J Spartan in Luxembourg.

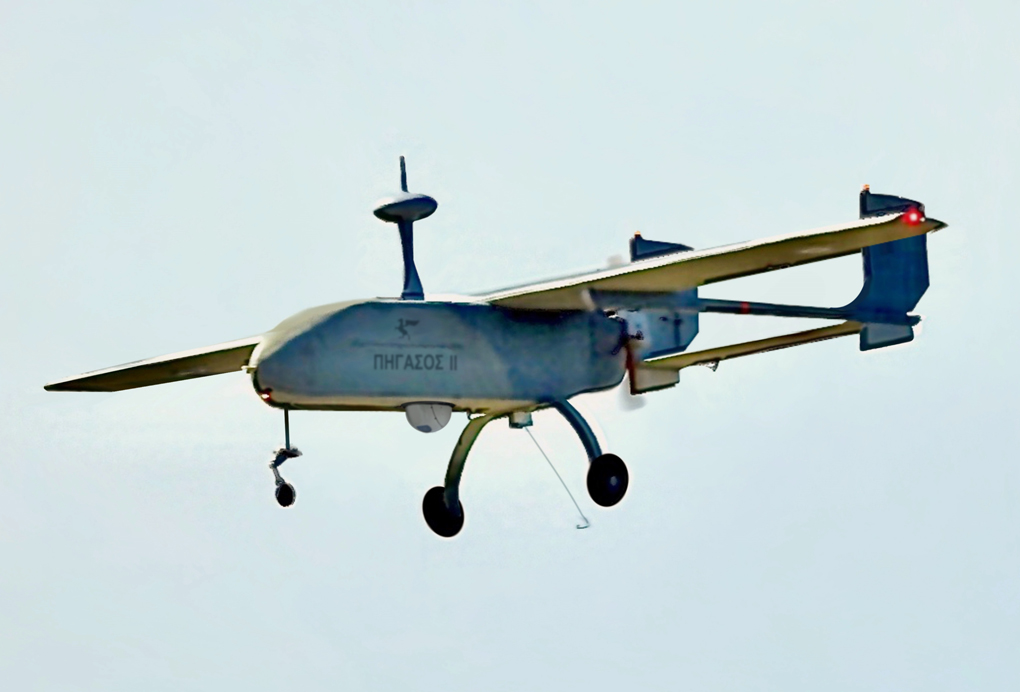
Pegasus II MALE UAV of the Hellenic Air Force, landing in Chios airport after new sensors testing.

In 1998, Greece decided, in collaboration with the German Aerospace Industry (DASA) and the Hellenic Aerospace Industry (HAI/EAB), to upgrade thirty-nine F-4E Phantom II fighters. The first aircraft was delivered at Andravida Air Base in December 2002. This aircraft, which was named Princess of Andravida (s/n 72–01523), was unique because it did not have the M61 Vulcan gun installed. All upgraded F-4s were equipped with the new AN/APQ-65YG radar similar to that of the F/A-18 Hornet, a new onboard Mission Control Computer (MCC), a head-up display (HUD), the identification friend or foe (IFF) interrogator, multi-function displays, and were also capable of carrying a variety of advanced air-to-air and air-to-ground missiles. These included the AIM-120 AMRAAM (although only the -B edition), the AIM-9M missile, the automated flight-director system (AFDS), and the entire family of the Paveway (I, II and III) laser-guided bombs. These aircraft were the F-4E Peace Icarus 2000 (PI2000) or F-4E Phantom II AUP (Avionics Upgrade Programme) variants. Although gradual retirement of F-4 units started in 2017, they are still operational in multi-role missions with the 338 Squadron 'Ares' and the 339 Squadron 'Ajax' based in Andravida air force base. The F-4E Phantom II PI2000 (AUP) has been certified for use of GBU-27 Paveway III laser-guided bombs, making the aircraft an excellent and modern platform for precision strikes.

In 2000, Greece decided to purchase a large number of fighters to replace the remaining non-upgraded F-4E Phantoms, a number of A-7 Corsairs, and the fleet of Mirage F1CGs. An order for sixty F-16 Block 52 Plus was placed. The order was for fifty single-seaters of the C version and ten two-seaters of the D version.

Until 2001, Greece participated in NATO's nuclear weapons sharing, using the A-7 Corsair II to deploy tactical B61 nuclear warheads from Araxos Air Force Base. Greece then strategically decided to remove all nuclear weapons under storage in Greece, and did not purchase any more aircraft with nuclear mounting capabilities.

In September 2004, Greece also decided to upgrade all of its existing Mirage 2000 to the Mirage 2000-5F (Mk2) standard, and place an additional order for fifteen new Mirage 2000-5Mk2 aircraft. The project was undertaken by Dassault Aviation and the Hellenic Aerospace Industry (HAI/EAB). The Mirage 2000-5Mk2 has a new and more powerful radar, improved long range air-to-ground capabilities which includes the SCALP EG cruise missile, a new self-protection system (SPS), a new inertial navigation system (INS), a glass cockpit, and the addition of aerial refuelling capability.

Eventually in 2005, HAF was officially the first air force in the world to add the F-16 Block 52 Plus to its inventory, since the first aircraft were delivered. This advanced F-16 type is an improved version of the Block 50, featuring a more powerful radar, conformal fuel tanks for longer operational range, advanced communication systems, an upgraded engine, Joint Helmet Mounted Cueing System (JHMCS), and is capable of carrying more advanced weapons, including the IRIS-T air-to-air missile. Three squadrons are operating with this type of F-16. These squadrons are the 337 'Ghost' in Larissa air base, the 340 'Fox', and the 343 'Star' in Souda air base.

In 2007, the Greek government ordered an additional thirty F-16 fighters; twenty single-seaters and ten two-seaters. However this time, the aircraft variant was the F-16C/D Block 52+ Advanced, that had been specifically modified for the Hellenic Air Force and offered as F-16 52M by Lockheed Martin, due to the improved computing power of the onboard mission computer (MMC). The difference between the Block 52+ and the Block 52+ Advanced, is the LINK 16 communications system of the Advanced version, as well as a more powerful mission control computer, an extra multi-function display with a movable map navigation, advanced debriefing system, and the capability to carry the RECCE reconnaissance pod. The first aircraft were delivered in May 2009, and operated by the 335 'Tiger' squadron at Araxos air base.

=== Later years and Greek economic crisis (2007–2018) ===
Due to the retirement & obsolescence of units that had concluded their operational cycle (A-7E Corsair II & F-4 Phantom II), HAF was looking forward to acquiring new 4th, 4.5th, or 5th generation fighters, and, at the same time, maintain a total number of three-hundred advanced fighters, also according to the Supreme Air Force Council's 2007–2012 operational planning - published in 2007. Candidates for the new generation aircraft were the Dassault Rafale, F-35 Lightning II, F/A-18E/F Super Hornet, MiG-35, and the Sukhoi Su-35.

During the Greek economic crisis (2008–2018), budget cuts forced HAF to ground many of its F-16s due to lack of spare parts & maintenance. In 2015, Greece placed an order for provision of spare parts in support of its F-16, F/RF-4E, C-130H/B, C-27J, T-6A/C, and other aircraft with systems / sub-systems of U.S. origin. The estimated cost of this order was $160 million. In addition, some long-awaited programmes were rescheduled for the future. The HAF modernisation programme estimated in 2007 that a purchase of forty-five advance training aircraft, fifteen search and rescue (SAR) helicopters, and forty-to-sixty new fighters was necessary. Some of these programmes were either postponed or, eventually, cancelled.

=== Post-economic crisis (2018–present) ===
The Hellenic Air Force currently possesses several fighter types and is in the process of obtaining new ones. The HAF currently consists of several F-4s, several variants of the F-16, Mirage 2000s, and Rafales. As well, Greece is in the process of obtaining several F-35s. In March 2024, Defence Minister Nikos Dendias announced that the F-4s will be retired and the older F-16s & Mirage 2000s will be sold off, streamlining the HAF.

This streamlining can be of benefit to other countries, such as India, which may buy the older Mirage jets. As well, the older F-16s may be sold to Ukraine, which is in desperate need of new aircraft.

== Developing programmes ==
=== SAAB GlobalEye ===
The airborne early warning and control (AEW&C) in the current fleet is the Embraer E-99 fitted with the SAAB Erieye radar. This was introduced over twenty five-years ago, and it is ageing. SAAB has offered the "Erieye ER" upgraded radar, or the buying of the new GlobalEye as a replacement for these old aircraft. This is still unconfirmed.

=== F-16 Block70/72 Viper ===
During the latter part of the Greek Economic Crisis, HAF after years of austerity decided to modernize the aging fighter fleet. It dedicated resources for the upgrade of the fleet of its existing Mirage 2000 and F-16 fighters. In 2018, Lockheed Martin was contracted to upgrade eighty-four F-16C/D Block 52+ and Block 52+ Advanced (Block 52M) to the latest F-16C/D Block 70/72 (F-16V Viper) standard, bringing capabilities to the fleet only available in 5th generation fighters such as the F-35 Lightning II. This upgrade was also considered by HAF as an essential first step for future compatibility with the F-35 fighter. Though HAF originally planned to upgrade all of its 123 Block 50/52+/52+ Advanced fighters and leave the Block 30 to receive parts of the upgraded ones, due to lack of funds, HAF decided to proceed with only Block 52+/52+ Advanced. After that, the Hellenic Air Force General Staff seemed to have decided to upgrade Block 50s to Block 50Ms (for Modernized), using equipment from the upgraded, without any final conclusion as of September 2024. The upgrade programme is scheduled to be completed by 2027, and carried out exclusively in Greece by Hellenic Aerospace (HAI). As of April 2026, 50 aircraft - more than half of the total aim - have been upgraded. In addition, Block 30s were decided not to receive any kind of modernization. Various proposals were made about selling them in Croatia, Lockheed Martin, USAF/USN or UAE. As of September 2024, there was no change in their status, remaining active, although Defense Minister Nikos Dendias has stated that Greek government is interested in selling them.

Latest decisions on the 38 Block 50s point out that they are going to be upgraded to F-16 Block70/72 standard, giving a total of 121 F-16s instead of the in-base modernization that was planned from spare equipment of Block52+/52+ Advanced. The Greek government has already sent a letter of request, awaiting answer even in September, 2024, for cost and availability. One major point of the agreement is where the upgrade will take place. HAF has request proposals for both, in-base upgrade in 111 Combat Wing in Nea Anchialos air force base, as well as in Hellenic Aerospace Industry (HAI) in Tanagra, among the other aircraft. Officials claim that upgrades in 111 Combat Wing will be less costly, plus there will be two production lines, making Block 50 to Block 70 Vipers conversions faster.

=== F-35 Lightning II ===
In April 2019, as part of the selection process for the new HAF 5th generation fighter, Greece selected the Lockheed Martin F-35 as a replacement of its older F-16 Block 30s or F-4 Phantoms, and as complementary to the F-16V upgrade programme. The timeline for acquisition of the new aircraft, depended mainly on the country's fiscal plans and Washington's ability to offer a long-term payment framework. At the same time, the US Pentagon confirmed Greece as one of five countries to be considered as potential new customers.

In January 2020, Greece formally expressed interest in acquiring and participating in the F-35 programme, following a visit by Greek Prime Minister Kyriakos Mitsotakis to the White House. A figure of twenty aircraft was initially floated, to be acquired following successful completion of the upgrading of the Greek F-16 fleet in 2027.

However, reports in September and October 2020, claimed that Greece could receive at least six F-35 jets much earlier, originally built for Turkey before its ouster from the programme, after the latter conducted tests of the S-400 missile systems purchased from Russia. In late-October 2020, it was made public that the United States and Greece had further discussed the sale of eighteen to twenty-four F-35 jets to Greece, during U.S. Secretary of State Mike Pompeo's visit to Athens earlier that month. The following month, Greece officially addressed a letter of intent (LoI) to the US Pentagon. In that LoI, Greece even showed interest in acquiring used USAF jets, if that meant initial deliveries could be agreed as early as 2021. According to earlier reports from Greek national daily Estia on 19 October however, an optimistic scenario would mean that the first six aircraft could only arrive in Greece by 2022, at the earliest.

On 30 June 2022, Greece's prime minister confirmed that the country has sent a request to the United States for the purchase of twenty F-35s, with the option of buying a second group of jets also being examined. The expected delivery date is 2027–2028.

On 27 January 2024, it was announced that the USA approved the sale of 40 F-35s to Greece. These will replace ageing aircraft such as the F-4. This was on the same day as Turkey's approval to buy 40 F-16Vs and 79 modernisation kits for its F-16Cs. The procurement of 20 aircraft was approved by the Hellenic Parliament on 27 June 2024. Greece signed the relevant Letter of Offer and Acceptance (LoA) on 25 July 2024.

=== Embraer C-390 Millennium ===
The C-130B/H variants are coming to the end of their service lives and will need to be replaced soon. As announced in January 2023, the Hellenic Air Force is in talks to potentially buy the Embraer C-390 Millennium from the Brazilian aircraft manufacturer. A potential option of retired C-130Js from the Royal Air Force or Royal Australian Air Force did not produce any results, neither the two C-130H from the USAF that were promised by the US diplomat Antony Blinken as a free-of-charge package of help via EDA, as costs to return into flight status were significant high.

The Greek government finally approved the purchase of three aircraft on 23 July 2026. 3 aircraft were ordered with an option for 3 more on 2 November 2026 through an intergovernmental agreement with Portugal.

=== Dassault Rafale F3-R ===
In August 2020, Greece announced the acquisition of eighteen Rafale multi-role aircraft from France. Initial reports stated that ten would be the new C-built Rafale F3-R version, and eight would be older F1 & F2 versions already in use with the French Air Force, that would be given to Greece free-of-charge. However, later reports stated that all eighteen aircraft would be the new F3-R version, and would replace an equal number of older Mirage 2000EGM aircraft, that had not been previously upgraded to the 2000-5 Mk2 version. Finally in January 2021, the official agreement with Dassault Aviation was ratified in parliament, and included the purchase of six newly built, and twelve 'slightly used' F3-R aircraft in previous service with the Armée de l'Air, for a total cost of €2.4 billion, including their armament and ground support. Theodoros Lagios, Director General of Armament and Investments of the Greek Ministry of Defence (MoD), and Éric Trappier, chairman and CEO of Dassault Aviation, signed the contracts in Athens on 25 January.

In June 2021, Dassault Aviation released the first photographs of Rafale F3R of the Hellenic Air Force, bearing the HAF roundel and fin flash, and in July, the first aircraft was officially delivered to Greece. The aircraft were commissioned to the 332 'Falcon' All-Weather Squadron, previously operating with Mirage 2000EGM/BGM jets.

On 11 September 2021, Prime Minister Kyriakos Mitsotakis announced the purchase of six additional Rafale, bringing the total order number to twenty-four. Greece officially signed the new contract for the acquisition of six additional new Rafale aircraft on 24 March 2022, which follows Greece's acquisition of Rafales in January 2021, and increased number of Rafales to be operated to twenty-four aircraft.

=== Unmanned aerial vehicles (UAVs) ===
In 2019, Greece reached an agreement with Israel for the lease, with an option to purchase, of two-plus-one IAI Heron unmanned aerial vehicles. These aircraft would be utilised by HAF and the Hellenic Navy in land and marine border patrol missions. Greek Herons include a unique maritime configuration with sensors and communications designed to monitor the extensive water borders of Greece.

In addition, in November 2020, the Greek multinational company Intracom Defense Electronics (IDE) was placed head of a consortium that included the Aristotle University of Thessaloniki (AUT), the University of Patras, as well as many other Greek and European companies from Cyprus, Spain, and the Netherlands, for the design and construction of stealth swarm drones, codenamed Project LOTUS (Low Observable Tactical Unmanned System). It was noted that two types of drones will be built as part of Project LOTUS. The first will be the 'mothership', a large drone with stealth characteristics, to be designed by the AUT based on the HCUAV RX-1 and Delaer RX-3 prototype designed by the university's Laboratory of Fluid Mechanics and Turbomachinery (LFMT). The rest will be smaller swarm drones built in large numbers, linked to, and supported by the mothership. These endogenous aircraft will be primarily used in border and maritime patrol missions, high value target reconnaissance and surveillance, while utilising data-fusion technologies to cooperate with HAF's future 4.5 and 5th generation fighters. According to IDE, the air force could completely cover its operational needs within a 5-year plan. On 9 June 2021, the Hellenic MOD approved the project for development, as part of sixteen other multi-national and European projects that were examined and approved by MOD technical staff.

In July 2022, the Hellenic Air Force signed a deal with General Atomics to obtain three General Atomics MQ-9B Sea Guardian UAVs. These will enhance the maritime surveillance capability of the air force, as each aircraft can remain in the air for forty hours, although no purchase has made up to September 2024.

Turkish drones frequently violate Greek airspace, and they can overwhelm Greek air defences. It is difficult for the likes of a Greek F-16 to engage a Baykar Bayraktar TB2 if it enters Greek airspace four times a day. For this reason, Rafael Advanced Defense Systems of Israel is providing the Drone Dome, a system of electronic devices. These can disrupt the communications and GPS signals of the TB2. This can deny Greek airspace to Turkish drones in the event of a war and even eliminate them with a 10 kW laser.

The defence firm Hellenic Aerospace Industry unveiled the new Archytas UAV at the Thessaloniki International Fair in September 2022. This is a fixed-wing UAV in a pusher configuration, with four additional motors to allow the aircraft to take-off and land vertically. Archytas is primarily designed for surveillance by the armed forces. However, it can also be used by civil defence agencies, and can be armed with up to 14 kilograms (31 pounds) of weapons. It has a range of 300 kilometres (186 miles), a top speed of 120 kilometres per hour (75 miles per hour), and a four-hour flight endurance.

It has been announced that the first Greek UCAV is under development named "Grypas", after the legendary animal. The project is led by HAI, with the collaboration of several universities such as the Democritus University of Thrace. Large scale production is expected to start in 2025.

== Regional role ==
=== Turkey ===
In international politics, the antagonism between Greece and Turkey has made it imperative for HAF to maintain parity with Turkish Air Force (TAF). HAF and TAF pilots have engaged in mock dogfights over the Aegean Sea for years, with some turning deadly; such as the 1996 shooting down of a Turkish F-16 by a Greek Mirage 2000, and the 2006 crash of a Greek F-16 where Greek pilot attempted a move to escape the Turkish F-16 and subsequently crashed into the Aegean sea with the pilot losing his life.

The regional balance of power in the eastern Mediterranean was inevitably affected during the Greek government-debt crisis. However, it was subsequently restored, influenced by negative developments in Turkey's F-35 programme in 2019, rise of diplomatic tensions in Turkey-US bilateral relations during the same period, and at the same time, the decision of Greece to direct funds towards the upgrade of its existing F-16 and Mirage 2000 fleet, and eventually to acquire new 4.5 generation fighters in 2020. By 2023, several Rafale jets have been delivered, as well as the upgrade of F16s to the Viper variant.

=== Cyprus ===
HAF is also tasked for the defence of Cypriot airspace, as Cyprus Air Command has no combat jet capabilities. HAF aircraft have to be able to reach the island and remain over Cypriot airspace for prolonged periods of time and possibly under combat conditions. The distance between the nearest Greek air base on the island of Crete and Cyprus is about 700 kilometres (435 miles). Furthermore, HAF seeks to have the ability to strike at distances of more than 1,000 kilometres (621 miles) from its airbases. To that effect in September 2020, during increased tensions between Greece and Turkey in the Eastern Mediterranean amidst Turkish attempts to conduct hydrocarbon exploration in disputed waters, Greek F-16 fighter jets taking off from Crete reached and landed on the island of Cyprus for the first time in almost 20 years, participating in joint drills together with Cyprus and France, and successfully returning to their home base after.

After the 2026 US and Israeli strikes on Iran, the Greek government deployed 2 Frigates and 4 F-16 Vipers to Cyprus in order to help the Cypriot National Guard defend the island, including the Sovereign Base Areas of Akrotiri and Dhekelia due to the inability of British forces to adequately defend the SBAs.

=== The Balkans ===
In May 2019, the defence ministers of Greece and Republic of North Macedonia signed a military agreement, for the policing and patrolling of North Macedonia's airspace by Greece. The agreement also included other areas such as military technology, cybersecurity, intelligence and air traffic control, all provided by the Hellenic Air Force. Since 2017, Greece and Italy also provide, in rotation, policing of the airspaces of Albania and Montenegro. Additionally, as part of Greece's conventional obligations within NATO, HAF and USAF aircraft cooperate in a variety of missions, from air patrolling, to ground target marking, and provision of air defence training to allied Balkan countries.

=== North Africa and Persian Gulf ===
As part of multilateral arrangements, Greece remains in close military cooperation with countries of the Eastern Mediterranean region and the Persian Gulf, including Israel, Egypt, Jordan, the United Arab Emirates (UAE), and Saudi Arabia. On 14 September 2021, the Hellenic Air Force deployed a fully equipped battery of MIM-104 Patriot missiles to Saudi Arabia as part of the Integrated Air and Missile Defense Concept. According to official statements, Athens and Riyadh had agreed on the deployment of the Hellenic Force of Saudi Arabia (HFSA) consisting of the MIM-104 Patriot System and 120 men with their relevant gear and infrastructure for an unspecified length of time, to guard "critical energy infrastructures".

In September 2020, Greece and the UAE conducted common air superiority drills in the eastern Mediterranean region, which lasted almost three weeks. As the two air forces share very similar types of fleets, and following these common exercises, the two countries signed a mutual defence agreement further reinforcing bilateral military and political ties.

In December 2020, Greece and Israel came closer to a €1.4 billion agreement over twenty years, for the creation of the International Air Force Training Centre (IAFTC) in the Greek city of Kalamata. The IAFTC will provide advanced training to new Greek and Israeli military pilots, as well as lease services to international air force customers, utilising the Alenia Aermacchi M-346 Master jet trainer that will replace the North American T-2 Buckeye. The main Israeli company committed to the investment is Elbit Systems. The International Air Force Training Centre (IAFTC) officially opened in October 2022, with fourteen Beechcraft T-6 single-engine turboprop aircraft, with M-346 and additional T-6 to join in the near future.

In May 2021 the deal was signed, and since 2023, the International Flight Training Center (IFTC) is in operation, housed within the Kalamata Air Base.

== Equipment ==
=== Aircraft ===
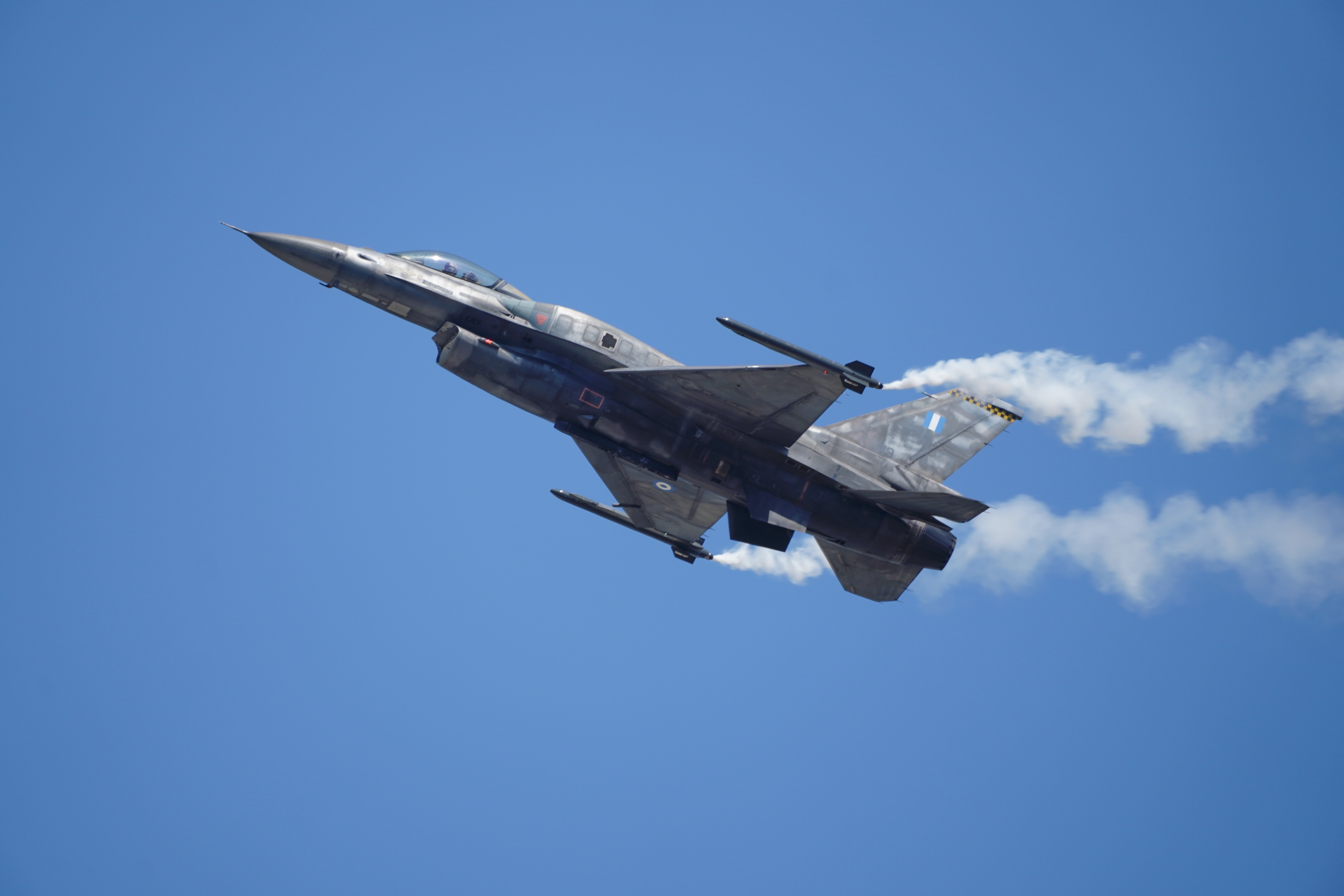
Hellenic Air Force F-16 Fighting Falcon during an air show.

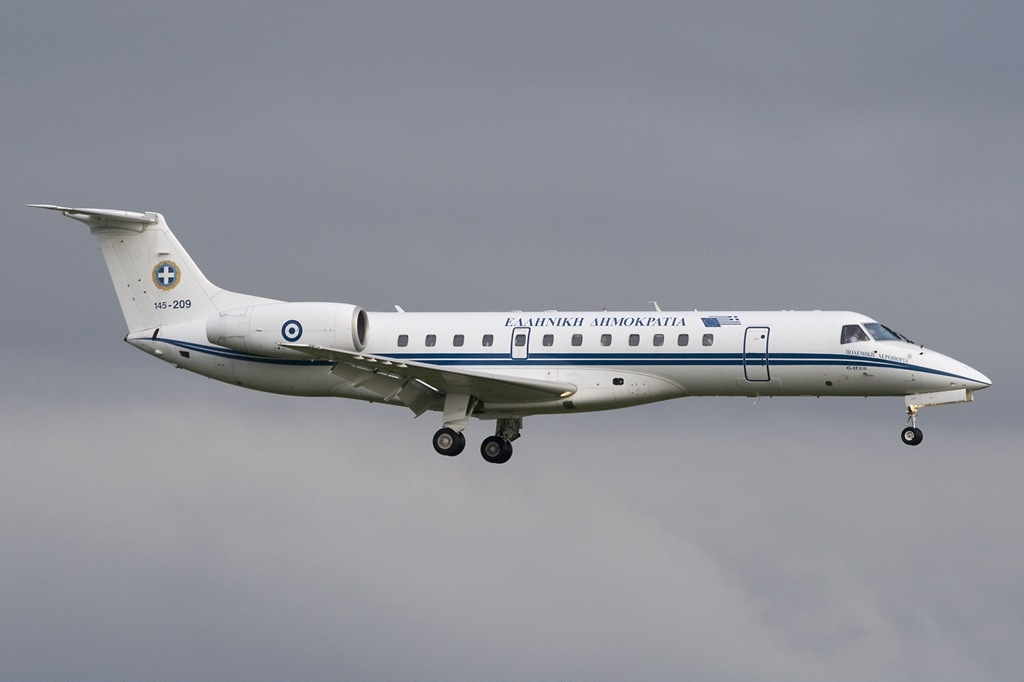
An ERJ-135LR in Luxembourg

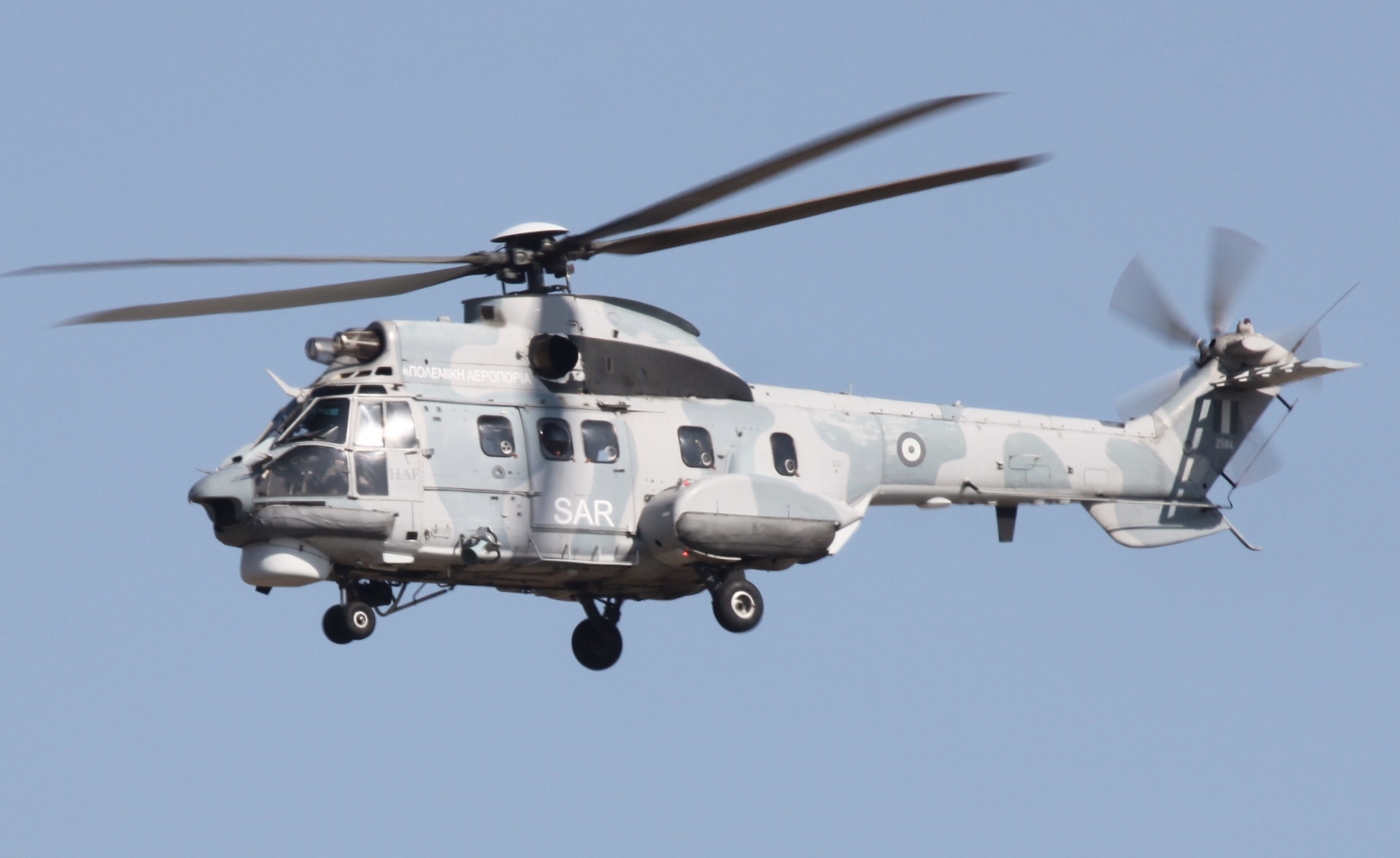
A Super Puma helicopter for the CSAR mission

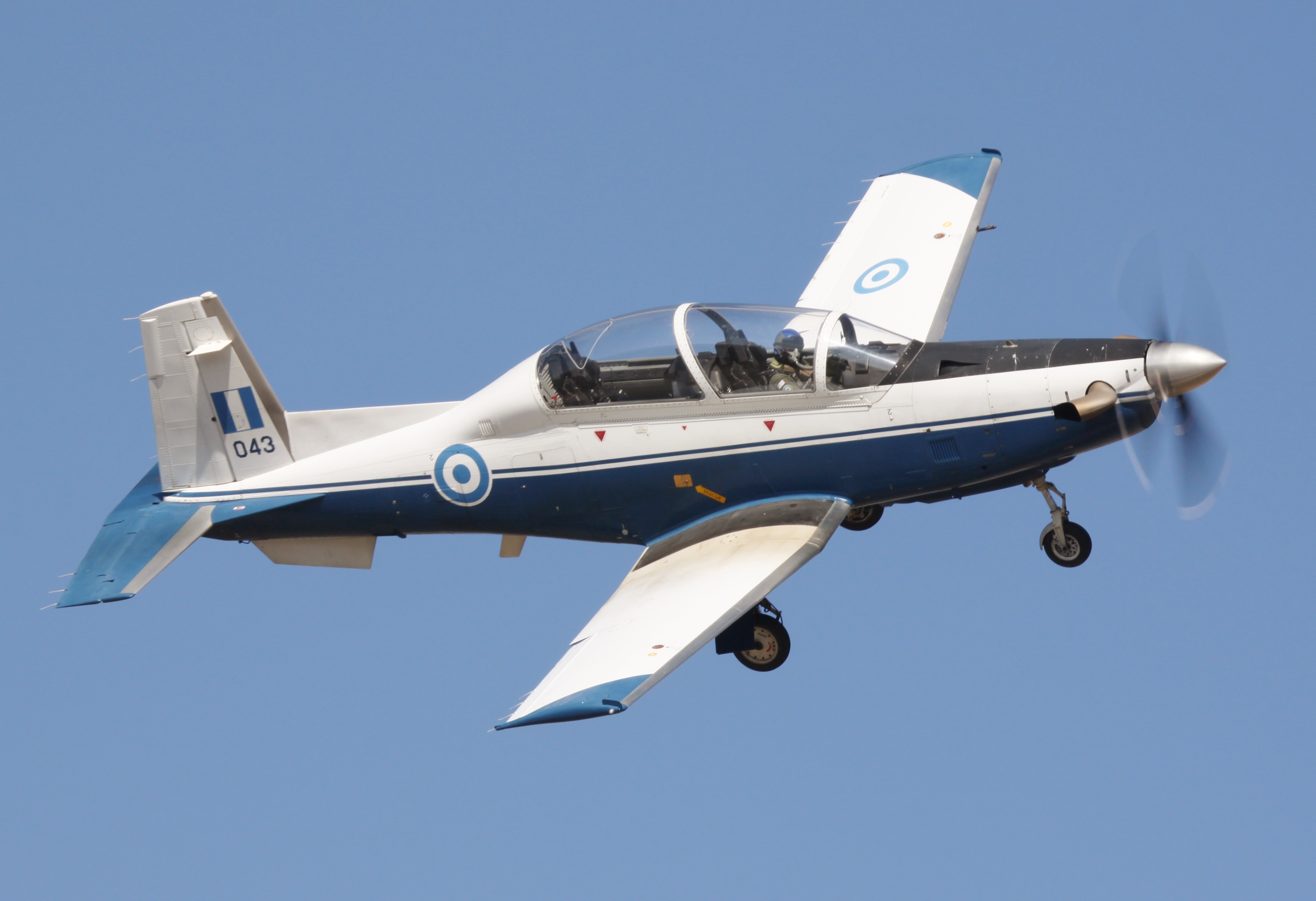
A T-6A from the training Wing at Kalamata

Aircraft	Origin	Type	Variant	In service	Notes
Combat aircraft (216)
Rafale	France	Multirole	Rafale EG F3-R Rafale DG F3-R	18 6	
F-16 Fighting Falcon	United States	Multirole	F-16C F-16D F-16V	113 39 60	39 variants provide conversion training. 83 aircraft have been designated for upgrade to the F-16V (Viper) variant by 2027 at Hellenic Aerospace Industry facilities. As of September 2026, 60 aircraft have completed conversion while in Oct 2026 it was announced that another 37 will be upgraded
Mirage 2000	France	Multirole	2000-5EG Mark II 2000-5BG Mark II	19 5	16/2 Mirage 2000 EGM/BGM were given back to Dassault in 2023 as part of the Rafale deal. 10 Mirage 2000EG in storage.
F-4 Phantom II	United States	Fighter-bomber	F-4E PI 2000	16	Upgraded at Hellenic Aerospace Industry; will be soon retired
F-35 Lightning II	United States	Multirole	F-35A	0	20 on order + 20 option
AWACS (4)
Embraer EMB-145H	Brazil	Airborne early warning and control (AEW&C)	R-99A	4	Also known as "Ericsson Erieye".
Maritime patrol (1)
Lockheed P-3 Orion	United States	Maritime patrol / ASW	P-3B	1	Extensively upgraded to P-3HN level at Hellenic Aerospace Industry; 1 delivered as of June 2026, with 3 more scheduled for delivery
Transport (29)
Lockheed C-130	United States	Tactical airlifter	C-130B C-130H	5 10	
Embraer C-390	Brazil	Tactical airlifter		3+3	A confirmed order of three to be delivered in 2027.
Alenia C-27J	Italy	Tactical airlifter	C-27J	8	12 originally ordered, the last 4 were cancelled.
Dassault Falcon 7X	France	VIP transport	7X	1	Granted free of charge by Dassault Aviation, it aims to fulfill an obligation not met by France following the Mirage 2000-5 contract signed in 2000.
Gulfstream V	United States	VIP transport	G500	1	
Embraer EMB-135	Brazil	VIP transport	135LR/BJ	1	A second Embraer ERJ-135 has been donated to Cyprus since September 2022.
Super King Air	United States	Air ambulance FIA	350ER King Air 360 King Air	2 1	The two 350ERs are operated on behalf of Ministry of Health. The third one is equipped with flight inspection systems (FIS) and is used for aerial surveillance and RNAV procedures.
Trainer aircraft (67)
Alenia Aermacchi M-346 Master	Italy	Jet trainer	M-346 Block 5+	10	
Beechcraft T-6 Texan II	United States	Advanced trainer Light combat	T-6A	45	
Tecnam P2002 Sierra	Italy	Basic trainer	P-2002JF	12	
Aerial firefighting (46)
De Havilland Canada DHC-515	Canada	Firefighting	DHC 515	0	7 on order to replace the CL-215.
Canadair CL-415	Canada	Firefighting SAR	CL 415GR CL 415MP	7 1	One aircraft is dedicated for SAR.
Canadair CL-215	Canada	Firefighting	CL 215GR	11	
PZL-Mielec M-18	Poland	Firefighting Air spraying	M-18B M-18AS	18 3	
Sikorsky S-64 Skycrane	United States	Firefighting	S-64 Erickson	2	Four more to be acquired by 2027.
Eurocopter AS332 Super Puma	France	Utility helicopter	AS 332 A2	2	
MBB/Kawasaki BK 117	Germany / Japan	Observation helicopter	BK-117 3M	3	
Helicopters (31)
Eurocopter AS332 Super Puma	France	CSAR	AS-332 C1	8	2 AS332 A2 previously used for MEDEVAC, replaced by the AW139 in 2026.
Leonardo AW139	Italy / United Kingdom	SAR	AW139	3	Replaced the AS332 A2 in the Ministry for Civil Protection
Bell 205	Italy / United States	SAR	AB-205	12	Built by Agusta.
Bell 212	United States	VIP transport	AB-212	4	
Agusta AW109	Italy	MEDEVAC	A-109E Power A-109 Trekker	3 2	Flown for the Ministry of Health.
UAVs (22)
EAV (HAI) Pegasus	Greece	ISR	E1-79 Pegasus Ι E1-79 Pegasus II	10 6	
IAI Eitan - Heron TP	Israel	ISR	Heron 1	3	Leased from Israel.
General Atomics MQ-9 Reaper	United States	MALE / ISR	SeaGuardian	0	The purchase of 3 systems has been authorized, but no purchase has been made, as of September 2024.

=== Retired ===
Previous notable aircraft operated were the Supermarine Spitfire, F-86 Sabres, Douglas C-47 Skytrain, Grumman HU-16 Albatross, Sikorsky H-19, Bell 47, Dassault Mirage F1, Lockheed T-33, Republic F-84F, Convair F-102 Delta Dagger, Lockheed F-104 Starfighter, Northrop F-5, A-7 Corsair II, and the RF-4E

=== Air defence ===
Current weapon systems of the Hellenic Air Force
Name	Origin	Type	In service	Notes
Surface-to-air missile (SAM)
MIM-104 Patriot PAC-2 (GEM-T); PAC-3 MSE	United States	SAM system	6 squadrons, 36 launchers, 320 missiles	
S-300 PMU 1	Russia	SAM system	1 squadron, 4 systems, 32 launchers, 176 48n6 missiles	
TOR M1	Russia	SAM system	4 systems, 16 launchers protecting S300 batteries	
RIM-7 Sea Sparrow	United States	SAM system	20 launchers	
Crotale NG	France	SAM system	9 systems, 18 launchers	
Air defence artillery
Oerlikon GDF	Switzerland	Anti-aircraft gun	40 guns	
Rheinmetall Mk 20 Rh-202	Germany	Anti-aircraft gun	n/a	

== Personnel ==
=== Ranks ===
Officer ranks

NATO code	OF-10	OF-9	OF-8	OF-7	OF-6	OF-5	OF-4	OF-3	OF-2	OF-1
Hellenic Air Force
Hellenic Air Force		Πτέραρχος; Pterarchos	Αντιπτέραρχος; Antipterarchos	Υποπτέραρχος; Ypopterarchos	Ταξίαρχος; Taxiarchos	Σμήναρχος; Sminarchos	Αντισμήναρχος; Antisminarchos	Επισμηναγός; Episminagos	Σμηναγός; Sminagos	Υποσμηναγός; Yposminagos	Ανθυποσμηναγός; Anthyposminagos

Other ranks

NATO code	OR-9	OR-8	OR-7	OR-6	OR-5	OR-4	OR-3	OR-2	OR-1
Hellenic Air Force
Hellenic Air Force	Ανθυπασπιστής (Note: Greece has only one level of Warrant Officer. According to the current issue (2021) of STANAG 2116, the Greek Warrant Officers are included in OR-9, however they are afforded the privileges of an officer. See STANAG 2116 note 29, page D-9); Anthypaspistis	Αρχισμηνίας; Archisminias	Επισμηνίας; Episminias	Σμηνίας; Sminias		Υποσμηνίας; Yposminias			Σμηνίτης; Sminitis

== Aircraft markings and camouflage ==
The primary camouflage scheme utilised by the Hellenic Air Force is the Aegean Ghost (Greek: Φάντασμα του Αιγαίου) scheme. This is modified slightly for each aircraft type, but is standard for all combat and transport aircraft in the inventory. Some training, search-and-rescue, and firefighting aircraft are coloured partially or completely in high-visibility colours for identification and easier location in case of an accident. The air force also frequently uses colourful commemorative schemes to mark anniversaries and other special occasions or for display purposes. National markings are applied to all aircraft, with the national roundel consisting of concentric blue, white, and blue rings, displayed on the fuselage sides and wing surfaces, and a tricolour fin flash of similar blue, white, and blue vertical stripes on the tail fin. The words Πολεμική Αεροπορία (or simply the abbreviation ΠΑ) are applied to the fuselage as well, although this is less common in current schemes. Aircraft in Aegean Ghost scheme may have low visibility markings applied in which blue is replaced by dark grey and white by light grey.

Originally, many aircraft in service retained the basic colour scheme they were acquired in. Prior to World War II, combat aircraft were given a green and brown top scheme with white or sky blue underside, similar to the Royal Air Force. After the war, jet fighter aircraft such as the Sabre and Starfighter would serve in a polished metal scheme. Later, most aircraft received green and brown camouflage again, consistent with the United States Air Force's South East Asia scheme, referred to as Vietnam camouflage in Greece. A-7 Corsair IIs would be some of the last aircraft to fly with this scheme, retaining it until their retirement, long after all-over grey schemes had become the normal application for Greek aircraft. C-130 Hercules transports which were used in south-east Asia early in their careers were repainted in an overall grey theme.

Original proportions

Variation used during WWII on some aircraft

Current proportions

Fin flash

== Aircraft accidents and incidents ==
The worst accident in the history of the Hellenic Air Force occurred on 5 February 1991, when Lockheed C-130H Hercules s/n: 748 crashed into Mount Othrys during the landing approach to Nea Anchialos. Sixty-three people were killed.

On 30 January 2023, a Hellenic Air Force upgraded two-seated F-4E Phantom crashed in the Ionian sea at around 10:30 am, 25 nautical miles (46,3 km) south of Andravida air base. The aircraft belonged to the 338th Fighter-Bomber Squadron of the 117th Combat Wing based in Andravida. The accident occurred during a training exercise with another F-4E that successfully returned to base, the aircraft that crashed was the No.2 of the flight formation. According to early sources, shortly before the crash, the two pilots sent a distress signal that they would abandon the aircraft and use the ejection seats, later it was indicated that neither of the pilots ejected from the aircraft. A large search and rescue operation involving helicopters and ships from the Hellenic Air Force, the Hellenic Navy, and the Hellenic Coast Guard was set to find and rescue the pilots. The co-pilot was confirmed killed, while the captain was declared dead a few days later. It is still unclear what caused the crash, but some speculate that it was due to a technical failure.

On 5 September 2026, a F-4E Phantom crashed during the Tanagra air show. Both pilots were killed during the crash.

== See also ==
- List of flying aces from Greece
- Hellenic Air Force Academy
- Hellenic Aerospace Industry
- Sedes Air Base
- Kavala AirSea Show
- Hellenic Air Force Museum
- F-16 Demo Team Zeus

== Bibliography ==
- Carr, John (2012). On Spartan Wings. Barnsley, SY, Pens & Sword Military. ISBN 978-1-84884-798-9.
