= Leonidas Arniotis =

Greek theatre owner and mechanic

Leonidas Arniotis (Greek: Λεωνίδας Αρνιώτης; 1862–1939) was one of the most famous entertainers and theatre owners in Athens in the late 19th to early 20th centuries. Though, he is most remembered as the first Greek to attempt to actually fly on an airplane in his home country.

== Biography ==
=== Early career as an entertainer ===
He was born in Sparta in 1862 and was one of the pioneers of theatre in his home town. By 1893, he reportedly already “occupied a leading position among the horse trainers in Europe", called the "winged horseman" in Paris. In the 1890s, he toured the United States, organizing shows with trained dogs and cats, as well as shows with horses.

In 1904, he founded the famous “Arniotis Theater” (Greek: Θέατρον Αρνιώτου) in Athens, a popular entertainment venue that hosted variety troupes, trained animal performances and avant-garde shows, while he also wrote lyrics, plays, and musical scores.

=== Attempts at flight ===
Also trained as a mechanic, Arniotis attempted to be the first man in Greece to actually fly on an airplane. His efforts utilized a damaged plane, probably a Blériot XI, although there are conflicting reports about the exact type. He brought the plane to Greece in pieces in 1909, and assembled and largely rebuilt it, using this chance to introduce a number of his own changes to the design (thanks to a team of carpenters and blacksmiths he had assembled), including a home-built propeller Thus, he proclaimed himself “inventor and airplane builder” (something that could be true to a certain extent, given the continuous modifications, reconstructions and part replacements during his trials) and claimed that in private trials he had managed small flights - probably short hops - of 40-50 metres. However, his famous first public attempt on September 26, 1910 failed. (Note: In later accounts, repeated in subsequent publications, it was erroneously stated that his first public attempt took place in spring 1908.) He attempted another failed public attempt in October 1910. By December 1910, he had further modified his plane into an early seaplane and claimed that, after all modifications and rebuilding, his plane was “a product of local industry”. However, his two public attempts to fly in January 1911, failed again. Arniotis kept improving his plane, installing a new engine and new wings in April 1911, and apparently managed to get off the ground (probably making short hops) since May 1911 – in that respect, being the first Greek to even momentarily take off the ground on an airplane, in his home country. Despite these, and other improvements that followed, his “flights” did not exceed a height of about 10 metres. These series of public appearances and failures to achieve sustained flight made Arniotis a subject of ridicule by the Greek press. The first Greek to actually make a sustained flight in the country was Emmanouil Argyropoulos, on a Nieuport IV on February 8, 1912.
