= Marinos Mitralexis =

Greek flying ace during World War II

Wing Commander Marinos Mitralexis
- Μαρίνος Μητραλέξης
- Marinos Mitralexis c. 1940
- Born: c. 1916; Mila, Messinia, Kingdom of Greece
- Died: 19 September 1948 (aged 31–32); Aegean Sea, off Tinos, Kingdom of Greece
- Education: Hellenic Air Force Academy
- Military career
- Allegiance: Kingdom of Greece
- Branch: Hellenic Air Force
- Service years: 1940–1948
- Rank: Wing Commander
- Conflicts: World War II; Battle of Greece; Greco-Italian War; North African Campaign
- Awards: Gold Cross of Valour

Marinos Mitralexis (Greek: Μαρίνος Μητραλέξης, c. 1916 – 19 September 1948) was a Greek flying ace during World War II credited with 5 aerial victories. He gained fame when he managed to bring down an enemy bomber by ramming its tail, on 2 November 1940.

== Early life ==
Marinos Mitralexis was born in 1916 in the village of Mila of the Messenia region. In October 1935 he enrolled in the Hellenic Air Force Academy, finishing his education in 1938 with the rank of Second Lieutenant.

== Career ==
Mitralexis graduated as a second lieutenant from the Hellenic Air Force Academy in summer 1940. In the following Greek-Italian War (October 28, 1940 to April 7, 1941), he was posted to the 22nd Pursuit Squadron, based on the airfield of Thessaloniki.

On November 2, a squadron of 15 Italian CANT Z.1007 bombers, with Fiat CR.42 fighter escorts, headed towards Thessaloniki. Soon they were spotted and intercepted by Greek PZL P.24 fighters of the 22nd Squadron. During the dogfights, three of the bombers were shot down, while the rest reached their targets, and then started to return to their base in Albania. Mitralexis, who had already shot down one bomber, was now out of ammunition, so he aimed the nose of his PZL P. 24 right into an enemy bomber's tail, smashing the rudder and sending the bomber out of control. He then had to make an emergency landing near the crashed bomber. Having landed, Mitralexis captured the four surviving crew members of the enemy aircraft using his service pistol.

For this extraordinary feat, Mitralexis was promoted and awarded a number of medals, including Greece's highest award for bravery, the Gold Cross of Valour. He was the only Air Force officer to be awarded it during the war. When Greece capitulated to Germany (April 1941) he and the rest of the surviving Greek Air Force personnel and aircraft escaped to North Africa to join the Allied forces there.

In September 1948, during a routine training flight in an Airspeed Oxford, the plane had severe engine problems and he died by crashing in the south Aegean Sea near Tinos.

== Legacy ==
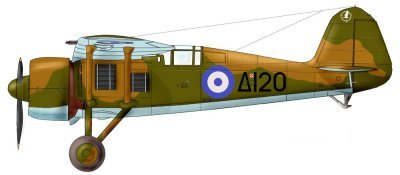
A PZL P.24, the main Greek fighter in the Greco-Italian War

At the outbreak of the Greek-Italian War on 28 October 1940, the Greek Air Force was severely outnumbered, counting only 79 aircraft against the 380 fighters and bombers available to the Italian Regia Aeronautica. Mitralexis' feat boosted Greek morale, being depicted in several artists' impressions, in newspapers and magazines, as well as on a postage stamp. It propelled Mitralexis to the status of a war hero, eclipsing his subsequent war record of five kills. A statue of him is erected in Ellinikon, Athens.

== See also ==
- History of the Hellenic Air Force
- List of World War II aces from Greece
