= Sopwith Gunbus =

British WW1 biplane pusher aircraft

Gunbus

General information
- Type: Fighter aircraft
- National origin: United Kingdom
- Manufacturer: Sopwith Aviation Company
- Primary users: Royal Naval Air Service Royal Hellenic Navy
- Number built: 12 (Seaplanes); 23 (Gunbuses)

History
- First flight: 1914

The Sopwith Gunbus was a British fighter aircraft of the First World War. It was a single-engined pusher biplane based on a floatplane built by Sopwith before the war for Greece. Small numbers were built and used by the British Royal Naval Air Service, mainly as a trainer.

== Development and design ==
In 1913 the Sopwith Aviation Company received an order for six two-seat floatplane from the Greek Government for the Greek Naval Air Service, which was in the process of being set up on the basis of advice from Rear Admiral Mark Kerr, the head of the British Naval Mission to Greece. Sopwith's design, known as the "Pusher Seaplane" or "Greek Seaplane" was a single-engined pusher biplane powered by a single 100 hp (75 kW) Anzani radial engine, with four-bay wings. It was fitted with dual controls for use as a trainer.

== Operational history ==
The first of the Greek Pusher Seaplanes flew in February 1914, successfully passing trials in March, with first deliveries in May and all six delivered by the outbreak of the First World War. Two more identical trainers were purchased by the Royal Naval Air Service, again for use as trainers, these being delivered in May. While the Greek machines performed well, despite the limited facilities available at their base at Eleusina, with at first no workshops or hangars available, the two British aircraft were less successful, with their engines proving unreliable, and were withdrawn by February 1915.

In March 1914, the Greeks placed an order for six more pusher seaplanes, the Sopwith S PG N, which were similar to their previous aircraft, but rather than being dual control trainers, were to be armed with a machine gun in the nose, and powered by a Gnome Monosoupape rotary engine. At least five of these aircraft were taken over by the Royal Navy at the outbreak of war, but again proved unsuccessful in British Service, with at least two being modified as landplanes. They remained in service until July 1915.

The Royal Navy ordered six modified landplane based on the S PG N in July 1914, the Sopwith Gunbus or Admiralty Type 806, to be powered by 110 hp (82 kW) Sunbeam water-cooled V8 engines and armed with a machine gun. The first one flew on 6 October 1914, and was found to be underpowered, so was fitted with a 150 hp (112 kW) Sunbeam. A further 30 aircraft were ordered from Robey & Co. Ltd. of Lincoln in early 1915, these being fitted with a modified nacelle, with the pilot sitting in the forward cockpit rather than the gunner, and fitted for bombing. Only 17 of these aircraft were completed, with the remaining 13 delivered as spare parts.

The Sunbeam-powered Gunbuses saw limited operational use, with one aircraft being on the strength of the RNAS squadron at Dunkirk led by Commander Charles Samson in February 1915, with Samson commenting that the Sopwith required "a lot of work on it to make it safe to fly". The Gunbuses were used mainly as trainers, being used by the RNAS at Hendon, and remaining in service until the winter of 1915–16.

The name Gunbus came from the Royal Flying Corps (RFC) pilot's slang term for an aeroplane, a bus, and was also used in the name of the Vickers Gunbus.

== Variants ==
Pusher Seaplane or Greek Seaplane
Dual control trainer floatplane powered by an Anzani 10-cylinder 100 hp (75 kW) radial engine, giving a speed of 55 mph (89 km/h) and climbing to 2,000 ft (610 m) in 12½ minutes. Six were built for Greek Navy and two for RNAS.
S PG N
Armed version of Pusher Seaplane powered by Gnome Monosoupape rotary engine. Six were ordered for Greece, with at least five commandeered by the RNAS at the outbreak of the First World War. At least two were modified as landplanes.
Gunbus
Landplane version for RNAS, the Gunbus was officially designated the Admiralty Type 806. It had a revised nacelle which was raised above the centre section of the lower wing rather than being directly attached and was powered by a Sunbeam engine. Six gun-armed aircraft were built by Sopwith, with a further 30 modified aircraft fitted for bombing ordered from Robey and Co., of which only 17 were completed.

== Operators ==
United Kingdom

- Royal Naval Air Service

Greece

- Hellenic Naval Air Service

== Specifications (Sunbeam) ==
Data from War Planes of the First World War:Fighters Volume Two

General characteristics

- Crew: Two
- Length: 32 ft 6 in (9.91 m)
- Wingspan: 50 ft 0 in (15.24 m)
- Height: 11 ft 4 in (3.45 m)
- Wing area: 474 sq ft (44.0 m^{2})
- Powerplant: 1 × Sunbeam Crusader water-cooled V8 engine, 150 hp (110 kW)

Performance

- Maximum speed: 80 mph (130 km/h, 70 kn)
- Endurance: 2.5 hr
- Service ceiling: 4,000 ft (1,200 m)
- Time to altitude: 15 minutes to 3,500 ft (1,100 m)

Armament

- Guns: 1× .303 in (7.7 mm) Lewis gun
- Bombs: Provision for underwing bombs

== See also ==
Aircraft of comparable role, configuration, and era

- Vickers FB.5

Related lists

- List of aircraft of the Royal Naval Air Service
