= Aristeidis Moraitinis (aviator) =

Greek naval aviator (1891–1918)

Aristeidis Moraitinis DSO
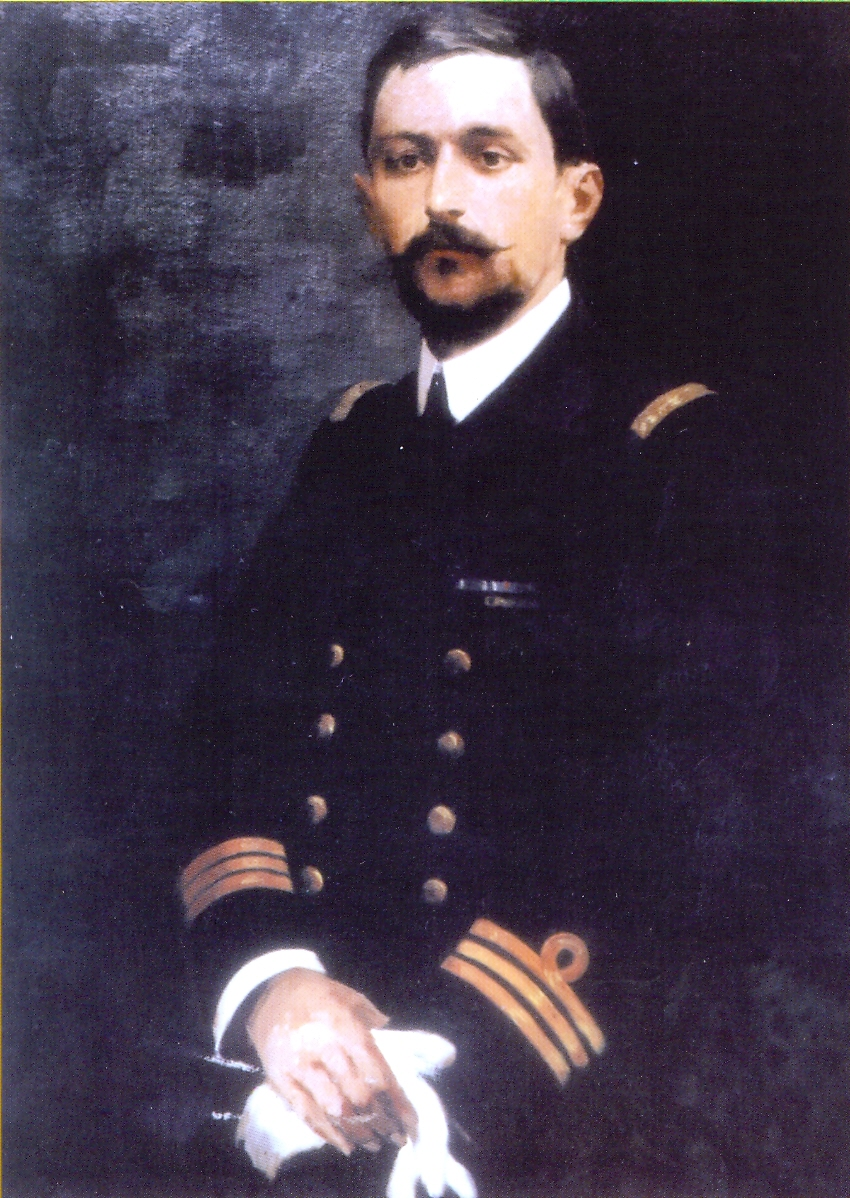
- A painting of Moraitinis in uniform
- Native name: Αριστείδης Μωραϊτίνης
- Nicknames: Fearless Aviator Ατρόμητος Αεροπόρος; Ace of the Mediterranean; Άσσος της Μεσογείου
- Born: 3 February 1891; Aegina, Kingdom of Greece
- Disappeared: 22 December 1918 (aged 27) over Mount Olympus, Kingdom of Greece
- Allegiance: Kingdom of Greece
- Branch: Royal Hellenic Navy
- Service years: 1906–1918
- Rank: Lieutenant Commander
- Commands: H2 squadron Hellenic Naval Air Service
- Known for: Pioneer of naval aviation. Only Greek flying ace of WWI.
- Conflicts: Balkan Wars; First Balkan War; Second Balkan War; World War I; Macedonian Front; Mediterranean Theatre; Battle of Imbros; Partition of the Ottoman Empire; Occupation of Constantinople
- Awards: War Cross; Distinguished Service Order
- Education: Hellenic Naval Academy

Aristeidis Moraitinis DSO (Greek: Αριστείδης Μωραϊτίνης, 1891–1918) was a Greek naval officer and pioneer of naval aviation. He participated in the first naval-air mission in history during the Balkan Wars and became the only Greek flying ace of World War I, with nine aerial victories.

== Early career and the Balkan Wars ==
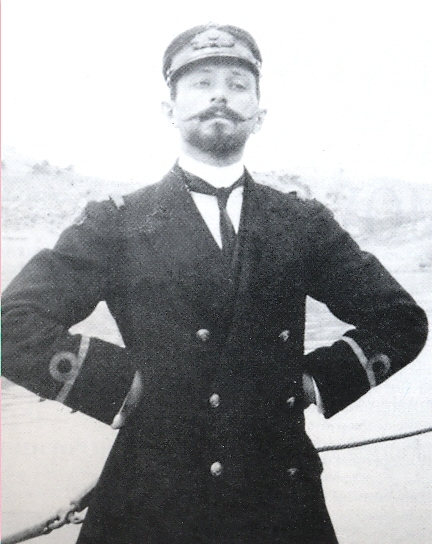
Moraitinis as an Ensign.

Moraitinis was born on 3 February 1891 on the island of Aegina. He entered the Hellenic Naval Academy in 1906 and graduated in 1910, joining the Navy with the rank of ensign. Two years later, the Balkan Wars began while he was serving aboard the torpedo boat T15. He eventually volunteered to join the newly established Hellenic Naval Air Service which was formed at Moudros, Lemnos.

=== First Naval-Air Operation ===
On 5 February [O.S. 24 January] 1913 Army Lieutenant Michael Moutoussis, with Moraitinis as his observer, were ordered to observe the position of the Ottoman fleet in the Dardanelles with their hydroplane, a converted Maurice Farman MF.7. When they reached the Nara naval base they noted down the Turkish ships and installations. Additionally, Moraitinis dropped four bombs, three falling into the sea and one on the ground near a hospital, but without inflicting any serious damage or casualties. This operation is regarded as the first naval-air operation in military history and was widely commented upon in both the Greek and international press.

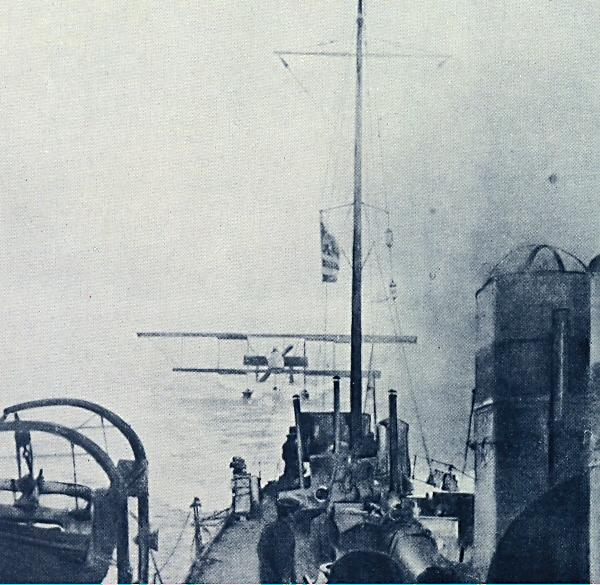
Farman MF.7 of Moutoussis and Moraitinis collected by the destroyer Velos, after their reconnaissance operation over the Dardanelles.

== World War I ==
In 1914 Moraitinis together with Dimitrios Kamberos took the initiative and established the first naval air force academy. Moreover, the same year, he founded the first aircraft factory in Greece, a forerunner of the modern State Aircraft Factory.

He was awarded British Aviator's Certificate No. 1087 on 26 February 1915; he had qualified the previous 22 September on a Sopwith seaplane at the Royal Hellenic Naval Air Station, Eleusis, Greece.

In 1916, he entered the service of the Provisional Government of National Defense, formed by Eleftherios Venizelos. It was at this time that he conducted air operations over the Macedonian Front, even bombing an airfield and three enemy trains in single sortie.

=== Greece Enters World War I ===
When Greece joined the Triple Entente in World War I (1917) Moraitinis was transferred to the northern Aegean, where he served under the command of the British Royal Naval Air Service, piloting Sopwith Camels. He carried out various operations over Eastern Thrace and the Gallipoli peninsula, bombing Turkish coastal artillery batteries at Çanakkale. He downed two German aircraft on 2 August 1917.

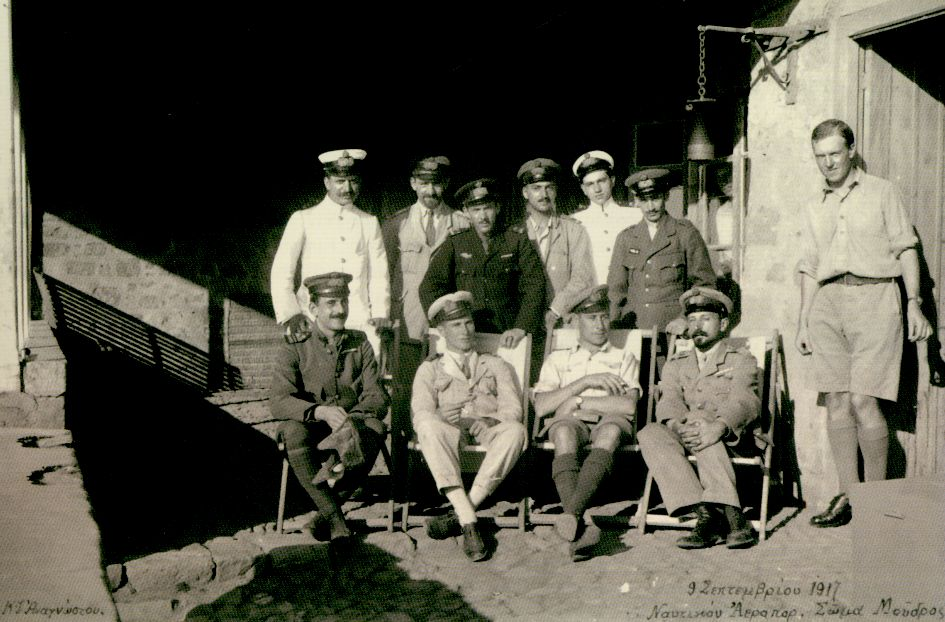
Aristeidis Moraitinis (seated, right) photographed with Greek and British aviators, 9 September 1917.

On 20 January 1918, Moraitinis was escorting two British Sopwith Baby on their way to bomb the Ottoman battlecruiser Yavuz Sultan Selim when they were attacked by ten enemy aircraft. He executed dangerous maneuvers and engaged the enemy in a dogfight, shooting down three enemy aircraft. For his service he was awarded with the bar to the Distinguished Service Order by the United Kingdom.

On 22 February 1918, he engaged in an inconclusive dogfight with German ace Emil Meinecke.

In May 1918, Moraitinis was given command of the newly formed H2 squadron based out of Kalloni airport on the island of Lesbos. From this position, they defended against German-Ottoman air raids and conducted bombing missions against targets around the Dardanelles and Smyrna. It was around this time that Moraitinis bombed a German cruiser at the port of Smyrna, as well as other military targets in the city.

By the end of the war, Moraitinis was credited with a total of nine aerial victories, making him Greece's only ace.

== Post-War and death ==
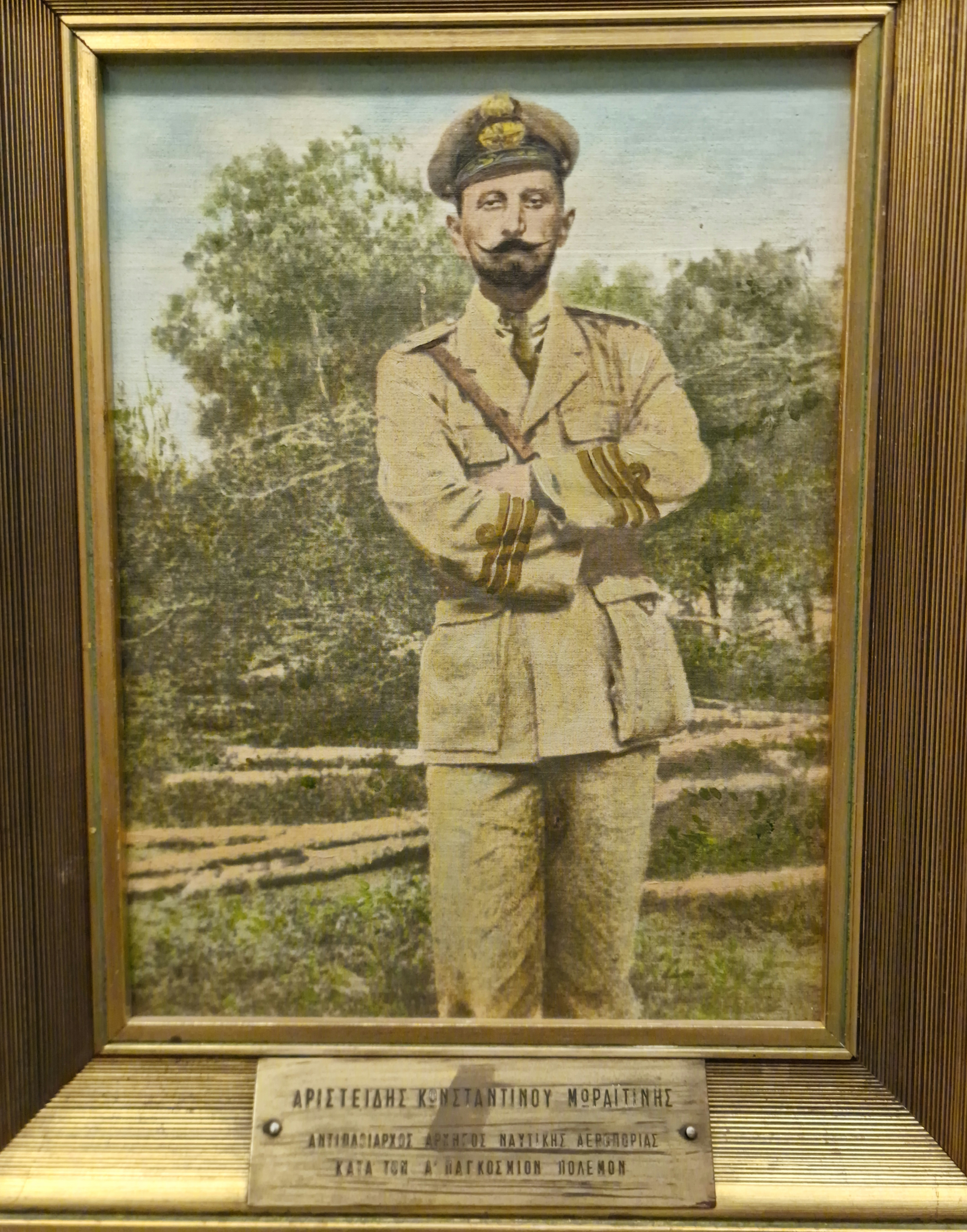
Portrait of Moraitinis from the Athens War Museum

As the war came to a close, Aristeidis Moraitinis became commander of the Hellenic Naval Air Service and, with Greece gaining a role in controlling the Dardanelles and the passage to the Black Sea, he arranged for his squadron to get involved. He and other aviators of the H2 squadron flew to Constantinople during the early days of its occupation. Their presence in the city was met with great enthusiasm from the Greek inhabitants.

On 22 December 1918, Moraitinis was flying from Thessaloniki to Athens in a Bréguet 14, a plane he was unfamiliar with. His plane went down as a result of foul weather conditions over Mount Olympus, crashing on or near the mountain. The wreckage was never found, nor was his body recovered. This led to the possibility that he may have crashed into the sea, somewhere between Pelion mountain and the Kassandra peninsula.

== Awards ==
- Greek War Cross
- Distinguished Service Order

In addition, he received a number of citations from Greek and British commanders, and the British offered him a new Airco DH.9 with the inscription "To the Commander A. Moraitinis, D.S.O.".
