= Dimitrios Kamberos =

Greek military aviator (1883–1942)

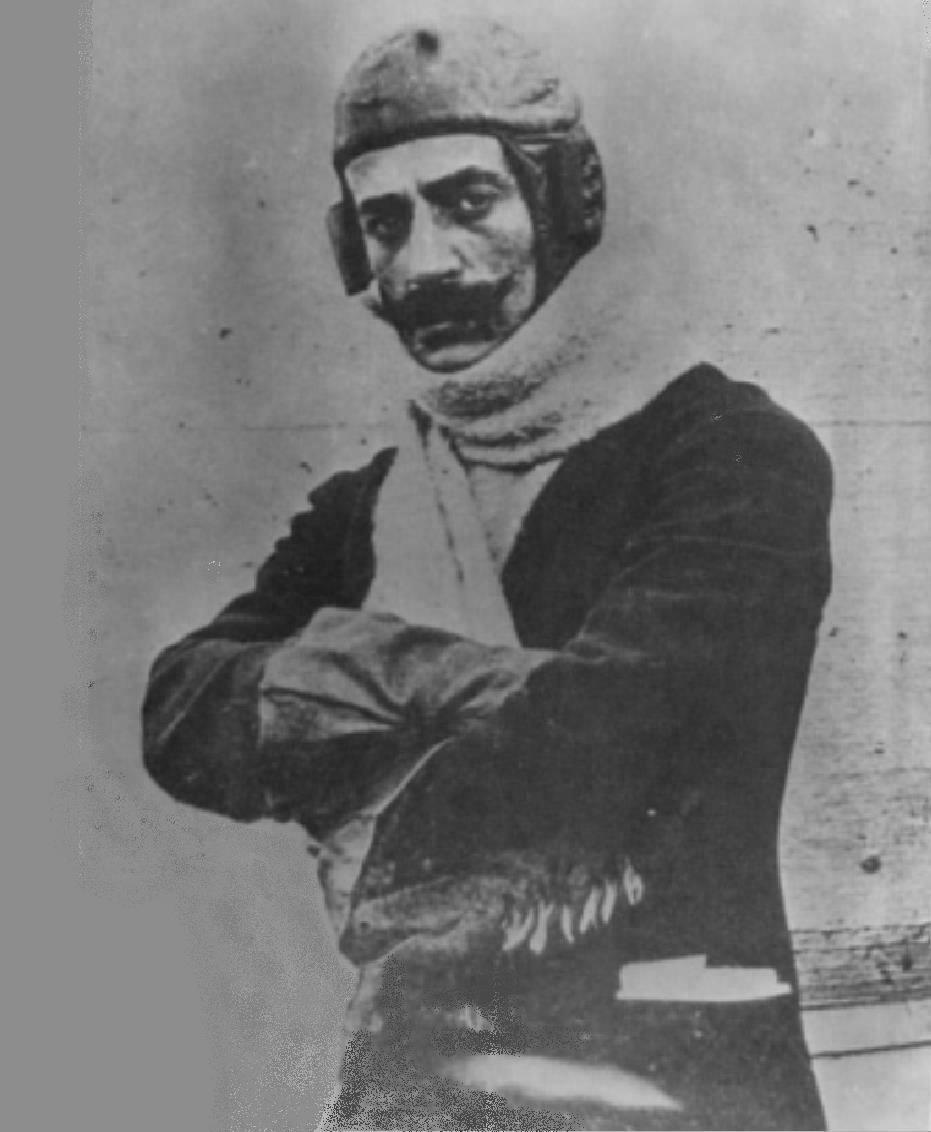
Photograph of Dimitrios Kamberos from 1912–1913

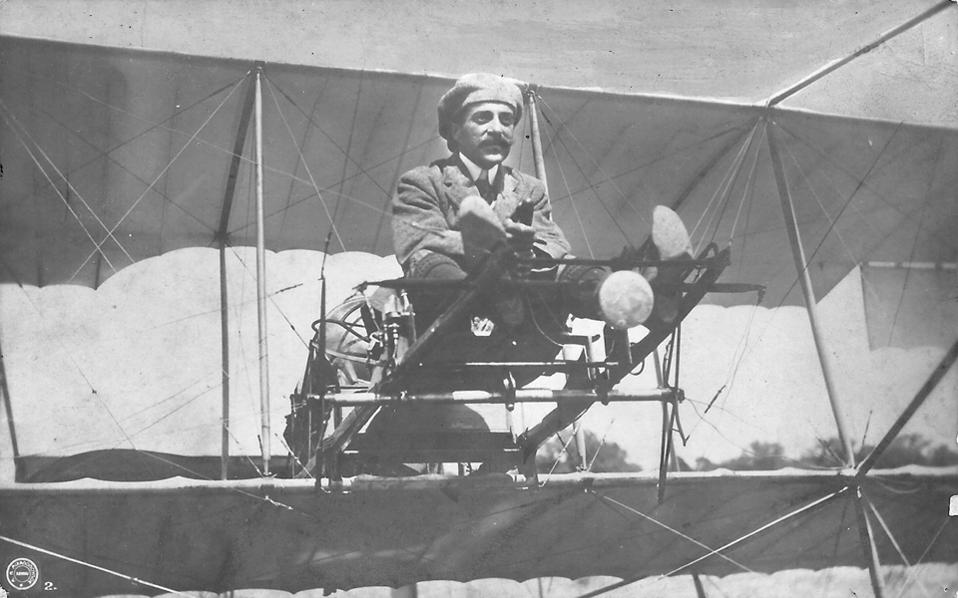
Dimitrios Kamberos, the first military aviator in Greek history on the "Daedalus", a Farman biplane on a 1912 photo.

Dimitrios Kamberos (Greek: Δημήτριος Καμπέρος, 1883–1942) a first Lieutenant, was the first military aviator in Greek history. His name was spelled variously in contemporary foreign sources, including Camberos and Cambères.

Kamberos was originally an artillery officer, and one of the first six Greek officers selected to receive training in France. The others were:

- Second Lt. Panoutsos Notaras (cavalry)
- First Lt. Michael Moutoussis (Moutousis) (military corps of engineers)
- Second Lt. Christos Adamidis (cavalry)
- First Lt. Loukas Papaloukas (infantry)
- First Lt. Markos Drakos (artillery)

They were joined by Emmanuel Argyropoulos, a private pilot, the first in Greece. The Army Aviation started with six planes, including four purchased from the Farman Aviation Works and assembled by French mechanics:

- One Henri Farman 20 biplane
- One Henri Farman biplane converted to a hydroplane, officially named Daedalus, piloted by Kamberos
- One Maurice Farman Hydravion
- One other Maurice Farman biplane
- One Astra hydroplane, named Nautilos, piloted by Moutousis
- One Nieuport IV G monoplane, named Halcyon, privately owned and piloted by Argyropoulos

Three of the Farman planes were christened Aetos, Gyps, and Ierax. The planes were paid for by money donated by a poet named Matsoukis.

Upon their return from France, Kamberos took the first official military exercise flight on 13 May 1912. In June 1912, after converting his plane to a hydroplane, he broke the world speed record at 110 km/h. He flew his first combat mission, a reconnaissance flight, on 5 October 1912, at the outbreak of the First Balkan War. After World War I, he served as the chief instructor of the military flight school. He died from Inert gas asphyxiation.

His brother Notis Kamberos was one of the main founders of Olympiacos CFP.
