= Emmanouil Argyropoulos =

Greek military aviator

- Εμμανουήλ Αργυρόπουλος
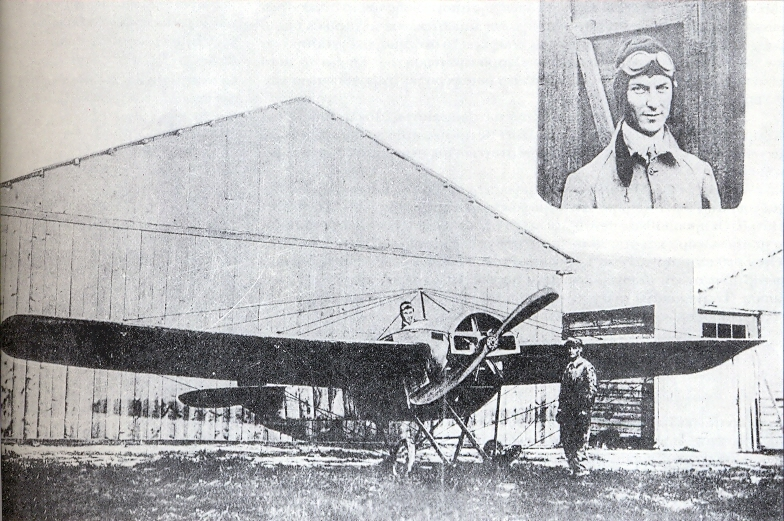
- E. Argyropoulos and his Nieuport IV.G aircraft
- Born: c. 1889
- Died: 4 April 1913 (aged 23–24); Lagkadas, Thessaloniki, Kingdom of Greece
- Cause of death: Plane crash
- Known for: First Greek aviator First casualty of Greek Military Aviation
- Aviation career
- Air force: Hellenic Army: Hellenic Army Air Service
- Battles: Balkan Wars: First Balkan War †
- Rank: Lieutenant

Emmanouil Argyropoulos (Greek: Εμμανουήλ Αργυρόπουλος; 1889 – 4 April 1913) was a Greek pioneer aviator of the early 20th century. Apart from being the first Greek aviator who performed a flight over his homeland, he also became the first casualty of Greek military aviation.

== First flight in Greece ==
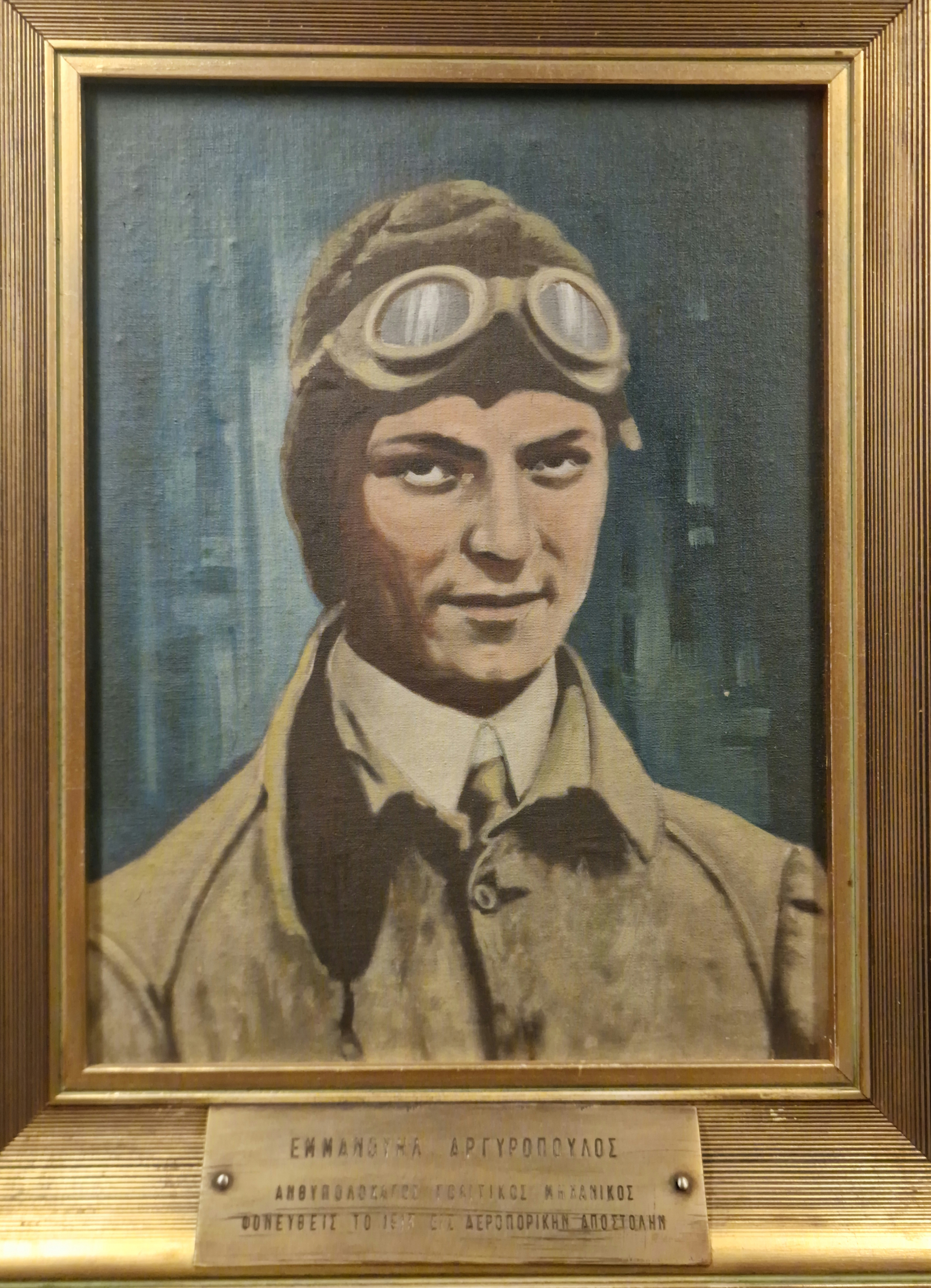
Portrait of Emmanouil Argyropoulos from the Athens War Museum

Argyropoulos, originally a civil engineer, abandoned his profession and went to Paris in order to study aeronautics. At the end of January 1912, he acquired his pilot license and returned to Greece together with a privately owned Nieuport IV.G 50-hp aircraft. On 8 February 1912, Argyropoulos became the first Greek aviator to perform a true flight in Greece (following failed attempts for a sustained flight by Leonidas Arniotis), an event that was widely commented upon in the local press. After taking off from the Rouf district of Athens, he performed a 16-minute-long flight around the city, including an overflight of the Acropolis. An hour later he carried out a second flight, this time with Prime Minister Eleftherios Venizelos as his passenger. Venizelos, was enthusiastic about the concept of aerial warfare, and stated that Greece should immediately take advantage of this newly invented weapon.

== Balkan Wars and death ==
When the Balkan Wars broke out in October 1912, he joined the military aviation with the rank of Lieutenant. On 4 April 1913, during a reconnaissance mission, his aircraft, a captured Ottoman Blériot XI, fell from a height of 600 m. while flying over the Langadas region near Thessaloniki. Both Argyropoulos and his passenger, the athlete and poet Konstantinos Manos, were killed. Argyropoulos thus became the first loss of Greek military aviation, and marked the end of air activities in the Balkan Wars.
