= Michael Moutoussis =

Greek military aviator (1885–1956)

Air Commodore Michael Moutoussis
- Μιχαήλ Μουτούσης
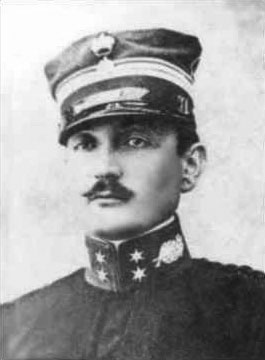
- Moutoussis c. 1912
- Born: c. 1885; Erineos, Achaea, Kingdom of Greece
- Died: 16 March 1956 (aged 70–71); Athens, Kingdom of Greece
- Military career
- Allegiance: Kingdom of Greece; Second Hellenic Republic
- Branch: Hellenic Army; Hellenic Air Force
- Service years: 1912–1932
- Rank: Air commodore
- Unit: Hellenic Army Air Service
- Conflicts: Balkan Wars; First Balkan War; Battle of Lemnos; World War I; Macedonian front; Greco-Turkish War (1919–1922)

Michael Moutoussis (Greek: Μιχαήλ Μουτούσης, 1885 – 16 March 1956) was a Greek military officer and pioneer of military aviation. Together with Aristeidis Moraitinis, he performed the first naval air mission in history during the Balkan Wars.

== Early career ==
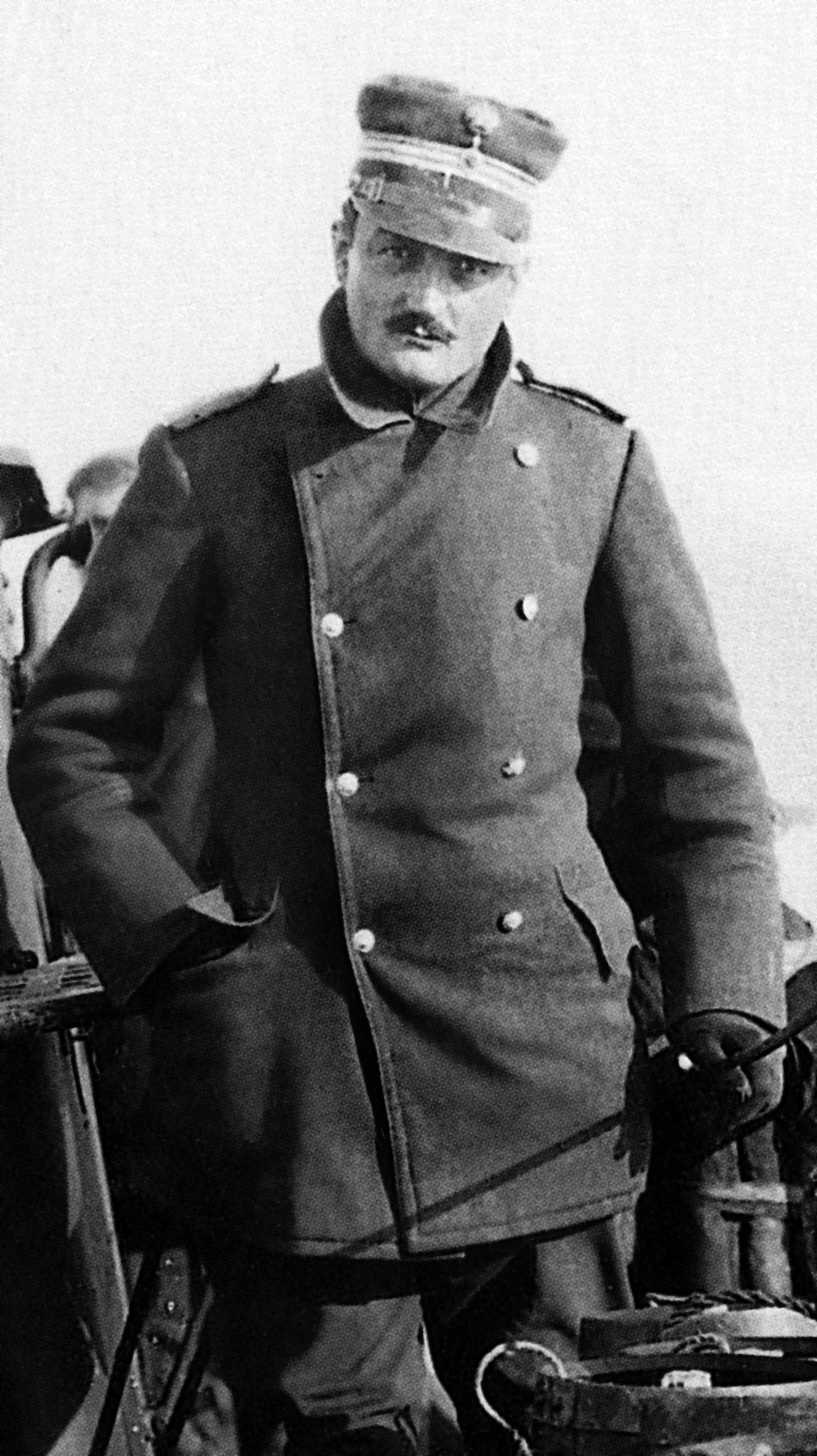
Moutoussis c. 1913.

Moutoussis, originally an Engineers officer, became one of the first six Greek officers in 1912 who were selected to receive aviation training in France, in order to man the newly established aviation branch of the Hellenic Army. In the following Balkan Wars (1912–1913) he initially carried out bombing missions on Turkish positions. At the beginning of December 1912, he was positioned in the Epirus front, where he performed various scouting and bombing operations in the region around Ioannina. At the end of the month he was ordered to move to the Aegean front of the war, where he took part in the Battle of Lemnos.

== Reconnaissance over the Dardanelles ==
On 5 February [O.S. 24 January] 1913 a few days after the Greek naval victory at Lemnos, First Lieutenant Moutoussis and Ensign Aristeidis Moraitinis were ordered to find the position of the retreated Ottoman fleet in the Dardanelles with their seaplane, a converted Maurice Farman MF.7. When they reached the Nara naval base, they noted down the Turkish ships and installations. Before they left the area, they also dropped four bombs, but without inflicting any serious damage or casualties. During the return flight, an engine failure forced them down in the Aegean Sea; they were finally collected by the crew of the nearby Greek destroyer Velos. This operation is regarded as the first naval-air operation in military history and was widely commented upon in the press, both Greek and international.

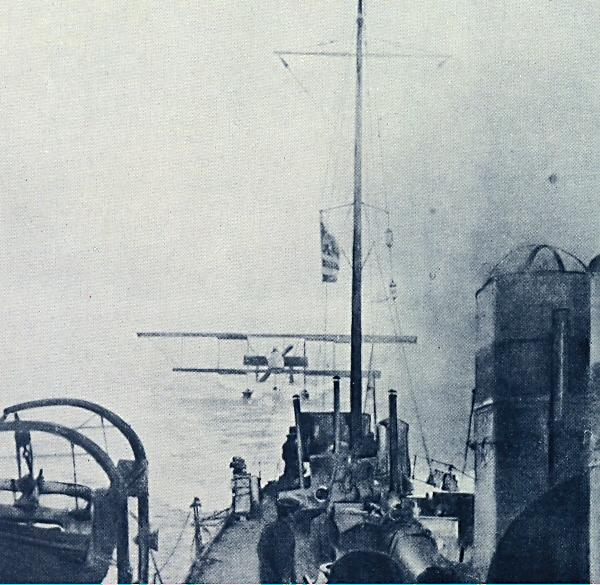
The Farman MF.7 of Moutoussis and Moraitinis collected by Velos after their Dardanelles mission.

Moutoussis also participated in the Macedonian front of World War I as well as in the Greco-Turkish War (1919–1922), where he was positioned in Proussa Air Field.
